= Calynda =

City in ancient Caria

Coordinates: 36°45′02″N 28°50′09″E

Calynda (also Calinda, Calydna, or Karynda; Ancient Greek: Κάλυνδα) was a city in ancient Caria.

== History ==
It was probably situated at the boundary of Lycia and Caria, for it is placed in the former territory by Ptolemy (xxxi, 16), in the latter by Stephanus Byzantius. Strabo places it 60 stadia from the sea, west of the Gulf of Glaucus, and east of Caunus. It appears, from a passage in Herodotus, that the territory of Caunus bordered on that of Calynda.

Its king, Damasithymos, was an ally of Queen Artemisia I of Caria, and was at the Battle of Artemisium and the Battle of Salamis with a ship on the side of Xerxes.

Calynda was afterwards, as it appears from Polybius, subject to Caunus; but having revolted from Caunus, it placed itself under the protection of the Rhodians.

Pliny writes its name Calydna. It is mentioned among the cities that struck coins in the Roman period.

Its site is located near Kozpınar, Asiatic Turkey.

== Bishopric ==
The diocese is not mentioned in the Notitiae episcopatuum, but a 458 letter of the Lycian bishops to the Roman emperor Leo I about the death of Proterius of Alexandria mentions Bishop Leontius of Calynda. This implies that Calynda was at that time a suffragan of Myra, the metropolis of Lycia.

No longer a residential bishopric, Calynda is today listed by the Catholic Church as a titular see.
