= Sicinnus =

Sicinnus (Greek: Σίκιννος), a Persian traitor, and helper to the Athenian leader Themistocles and pedagogue to his children according to Plutarch. He is known for his actions as a negotiator between Themistocles and the Persian ruler Xerxes I during the Second Persian invasion of Greece. Sicinnus deceived Xerxes into sending his fleet into Themistocles' trap.

== Battle of Salamis ==
In 480 BC, he was employed by his master in a stratagem directed against the Persian king, Xerxes, before the Battle of Salamis. The Greek fleet, which had assembled at Salamis, was composed of several contingents. Although the Athenian was the largest, command was held by the Spartan Eurybiades. He and other Peloponnesian leaders desired to withdraw from Salamis towards the Peloponnese, while Themistocles insisted that they stay and fight at Salamis, where the straits would negate the Persian numerical superiority. In order to avoid a possible withdrawal and commit his allies to the fight, Themistocles sent Sicinnus to Xerxes, who convinced the Persian king that the Greeks were in near panic, and that if he wanted them not to escape, the Persian fleet should blockade the escape route on the southwestern side of Salamis. Themistocles thus attracted Xerxes into his trap: the Persian fleet was lured into the straits, while at the same time, the Egyptian squadron, one of the best in the Persian navy, remained committed in the blockade and absent from the battle.

== Aftermath ==
After their victory at Salamis, the Greeks pursued the Persian fleet as far as Andros, but then came to the resolution to continue the chase no further, lest they should inspire the enemy with the courage of despair. Hereupon Themistocles, according to Herodotus, again sent Sicinnus, with others on whom he could depend, to Xerxes, to claim merit with him for having dissuaded the Greeks from intercepting his flight. As a reward for his services, Themistocles afterwards enriched Sicinnus, and obtained for him the citizenship of Thespiae.

=== Sikinnis dance ===
Some have identified the subject of the present article with the Sicinnus who is mentioned by Athenaeus as the reputed inventor of the Sikinnis dance (ἡ σίκιννις, gen.: σικίννιδος) in the satyr play. Athenaeus tells us that, according to some, he was a barbarian, according to others, a Cretan. The dancers were called Sikinnistai (Σικιννισταί).
