= Adeimantus of Corinth =

5th century BCE Corinthian naval commander

- Ἀδείμαντος
- Relatives: Ocytus
- Military career
- Allegiance: Corinthian
- Conflicts: Battle of Artemisium; Battle of Salamis

Adeimantus of Corinth (/ˈædiːˌmæntəs/; Greek: Ἀδείμαντος), son of Ocytus (Ὠκύτος), was the Corinthian commander during the invasion of Greece by Xerxes. Before the Battle of Artemisium (480 BC) he threatened to sail away.

According to the Suda, when Adeimantus called Themistocles a city-less man before the Battle of Salamis (because the Persians had destroyed Athens), Themistocles responded: "Who is city-less, when he has 200 triremes?"

According to the Athenians he took to flight at the very commencement of the battle, but this was denied by the Corinthians and the other Greeks.

Adeimantus' son Aristeus was the Corinthian commander at the Battle of Potidaea in 432 BC.
