= Battle of Artemisium =

Part of the second Persian invasion of Greece in 480 BC

- Part of the Second Persian invasion of Greece
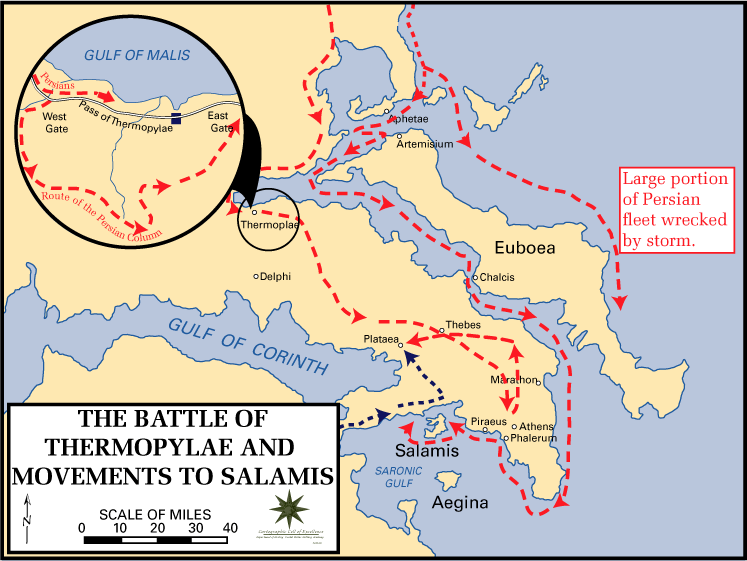
- Movements of the Persian and Greek armies in 480–479 BC.
Date	21–23 July, 480 BC
Location	Artemisium, Euboea 39°3′0″N 23°12′0″E
Result	Persian victory
Territorial changes	Persians gain control of Euboea

Belligerents
Athens; Sparta; Corinth other Greek city-states	Achaemenid Empire

Commanders and leaders
Themistocles; Eurybiades; Adeimantus	Achaemenes; Ariabignes; Artemisia I; Damasithymus

Strength
271 ships; 4,065 marines; 46,070 oarsmen	1,207 ships; 36,210 marines; 205,190 oarsmen

Casualties and losses
100 ships lost	400 ships lost
- Location of the cape of Artemisium

The Battle of Artemisium or Artemision was a series of naval engagements over three days during the second Persian invasion of Greece. The battle took place simultaneously with the land battle at Thermopylae, in August or September 480 BC, off the coast of Euboea and was fought between an alliance of Greek city-states, including Sparta, Athens, Corinth and others, and the Persian Empire of Xerxes I.

The Persian invasion was a delayed response to the defeat of the first Persian invasion of Greece, which had been ended by the Athenian victory at the Battle of Marathon. King Xerxes had amassed a huge army and navy, and set out to conquer all of Greece. The Athenian general Themistocles proposed that the Allied Greeks block the advance of the Persian army at the pass of Thermopylae and simultaneously block the Persian navy at the Straits of Artemisium. An Allied naval force of 271 triremes was thus dispatched to await the arrival of the Persians.

Approaching Artemisium towards the end of summer, the Persian navy was caught in a gale off the coast of Magnesia and lost around a third of their 1200 ships. After arriving at Artemisium, the Persians sent a detachment of 200 ships around the coast of Euboea in an attempt to trap the Greeks, but these were caught in another storm and shipwrecked. The main action of the battle took place after two days of smaller engagements. The two sides fought all day, with roughly equal losses; however, the smaller Allied fleet could not afford the losses.

After the engagement, the Allies received news of the defeat of the Allied army at Thermopylae. Since their strategy required both Thermopylae and Artemisium to be held, and given their losses, the Allies decided to withdraw to Salamis. The Persians overran and gained control over Phocis, then Boeotia, and finally entered Attica where they captured the now-evacuated Athens. However, seeking a decisive victory over the Allied fleet, the Persians were later defeated at the Battle of Salamis in late 480 BC. Fearing being trapped in Europe, Xerxes withdrew with much of his army to Asia, leaving Mardonius to complete the conquest of Greece. The following year, however, saw an Allied army decisively defeat the Persians at the Battle of Plataea, thereby ending the Persian invasion.

== Background ==
The Persian emperor Xerxes I decided that the Hellespont had to be bridged for his army to cross to Europe, and that a canal should be dug across the isthmus of Mount Athos. By early 480 BC, the preparations were complete, and the army Xerxes had mustered at Sardis marched towards Europe, crossing the Hellespont on two pontoon bridges.

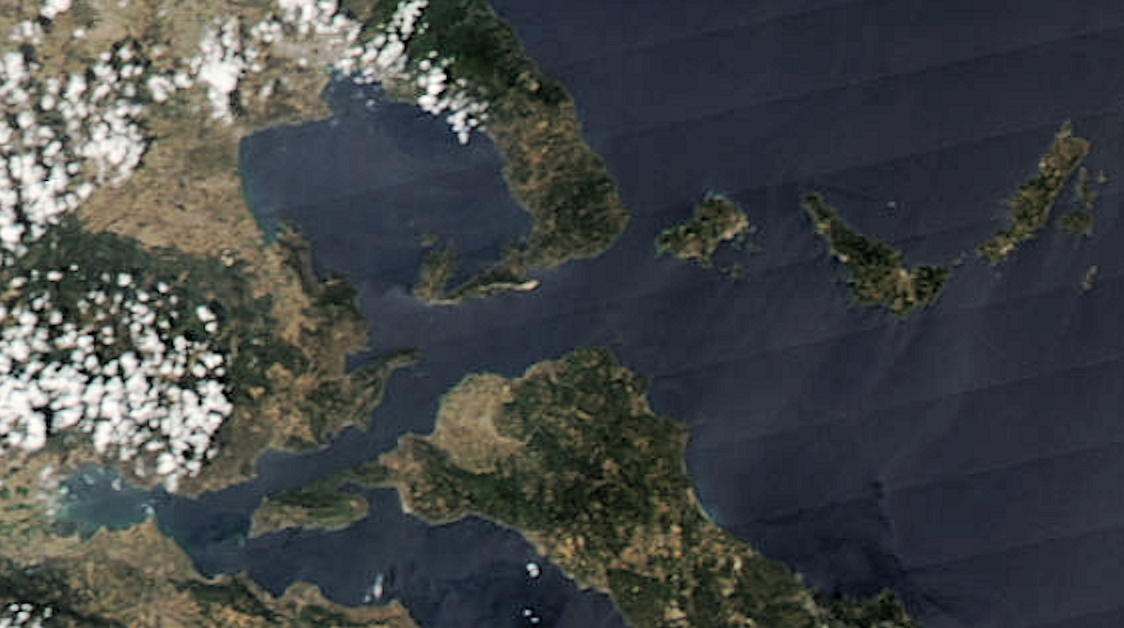
Site of the Battle of Artemisium (center). The location of the Battle of Thermopylae appears in the lower left corner.

The Athenians had also been preparing for war with the Persians since the mid-480s BC, and in 482 BC the decision was taken, under the guidance of the Athenian politician Themistocles, to build a massive fleet of triremes that would be necessary for the Greeks to fight the Persians. However, the Athenians did not have the manpower to fight on land and sea; and therefore combating the Persians would require an alliance of Greek city states. In 481 BC, Xerxes sent ambassadors around Greece asking for earth and water, but making the very deliberate omission of Athens and Sparta. Support thus began to coalesce around these two leading states. A congress of city states met at Corinth in late autumn of 481 BC, and a confederate alliance of Greek city-states was formed. It had the power to send envoys asking for assistance and to dispatch troops from the member states to defensive points after joint consultation. This was remarkable for the disjointed Greek world, especially since many of the city-states in attendance were still technically at war with each other.

A map showing the Greek world at the time of the battle.

The 'congress' met again in the spring of 480 BC. A Thessalian delegation suggested that the allies could muster in the narrow Vale of Tempe, on the borders of Thessaly, and thereby block Xerxes's advance. A force of 10,000 hoplites was dispatched to the Vale of Tempe, through which they believed the Persian army would have to pass. However, once there, they were warned by Alexander I of Macedon that the vale could be bypassed through the Sarantoporo Pass, and that the army of Xerxes was overwhelming, the Greeks retreated. Shortly afterwards, they received the news that Xerxes had crossed the Hellespont.

Themistocles therefore suggested a second strategy to the allies. The route to southern Greece (Boeotia, Attica and the Peloponnesus) would require the army of Xerxes to travel through the very narrow pass of Thermopylae. The pass could easily be blocked by the Greek hoplites, despite the overwhelming numbers of the Persians. Furthermore, to prevent the Persians bypassing Thermopylae by sea, the Athenian and allied navies could block the straits of Artemisium. This dual strategy was adopted by the congress. However, the Peloponnesian cities made contingency plans to defend the Isthmus of Corinth should all else fail, whilst the women and children of Athens were evacuated en masse to the Peloponnesian city of Troezen.

== Prelude ==
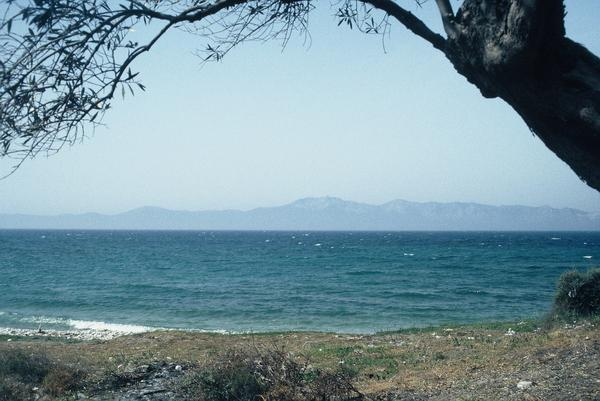
Beach at Cape Artemisium. Magnesia in the distance.

The Allied fleet sailed north to Cape Artemisium once it became known that the Persian army was advancing along the coast past Mount Olympus, probably around late July or the beginning of August. The Allies took up station at Artemisium, most likely beaching their ships at the headland, from which they could quickly launch them as needed. The Allies sent three ships to Skiathos as scouts to provide warning of the approach of the Persian fleet but two weeks passed without sight. Finally, ten Sidonian triremes arrived off Skiathos, sent on a scouting mission by the Persian fleet anchored at Therma in Macedonia. Three of these ships crashed into a reef called the Ant/Myrmex, located midway between Skiathos and Magnesia. (Note: The Persians placed a stone pillar at the site where three of their ships had crashed to indicate the presence of a dangerous reef. The Greek admiral Stylianos Lykoudis found some stone blocks which he thought were remnants of the pillar put up by the Persians.) The main Allied fleet was informed of their arrival by a fire-beacon lit on the island. However, the Allied patrol ships themselves were caught unaware and two were captured, whilst one ran aground. According to Herodotus, in the ensuing confusion, unsure whether or not the beacon heralded the arrival of the whole Persian fleet, as a precaution the whole Allied fleet launched into the straits of Artemisium. Once it became clear that the Persian fleet was not going to arrive that day, they decided to sail to Chalcis, halfway down on the western coast of Euboea, leaving men on the heights of Euboea to warn of the actual arrival of the Persian ships.

Historians suggest that the Allies may have misinterpreted the Persian movements and come to the mistaken conclusion that the Persians were sailing east around Skiathos, aiming to sail around the eastern side of Euboea. The signals sent by fire beacons must have been very simplistic, and potentially interpreted wrongly; alternatively, the signallers may have genuinely believed that the Persian fleet was sailing to the east of Skiathos. If the Persians sailed around the outer, eastern side of Euboea, they could head straight to Attica, and thereby cut off the Allied fleet's line of retreat. Furthermore, the Persians had enough ships to attempt to both attack the Straits of Artemisium, and sail around Euboea. The withdrawal to Chalcis therefore gave the Allies the opportunity to escape from the Straits of Euboea if the Persians did travel around the outside of Euboea, but also allowed them to return to Artemisium if necessary. In this context, the watchers left on Euboea could inform the Allies if the Persian fleet did indeed sail east of Euboea. The Allied fleet thus continued to wait at Chalcis. Nevertheless, the Allies, undoubtedly anxious about facing a Persian fleet that so greatly outnumbered them, may have somewhat overreacted.

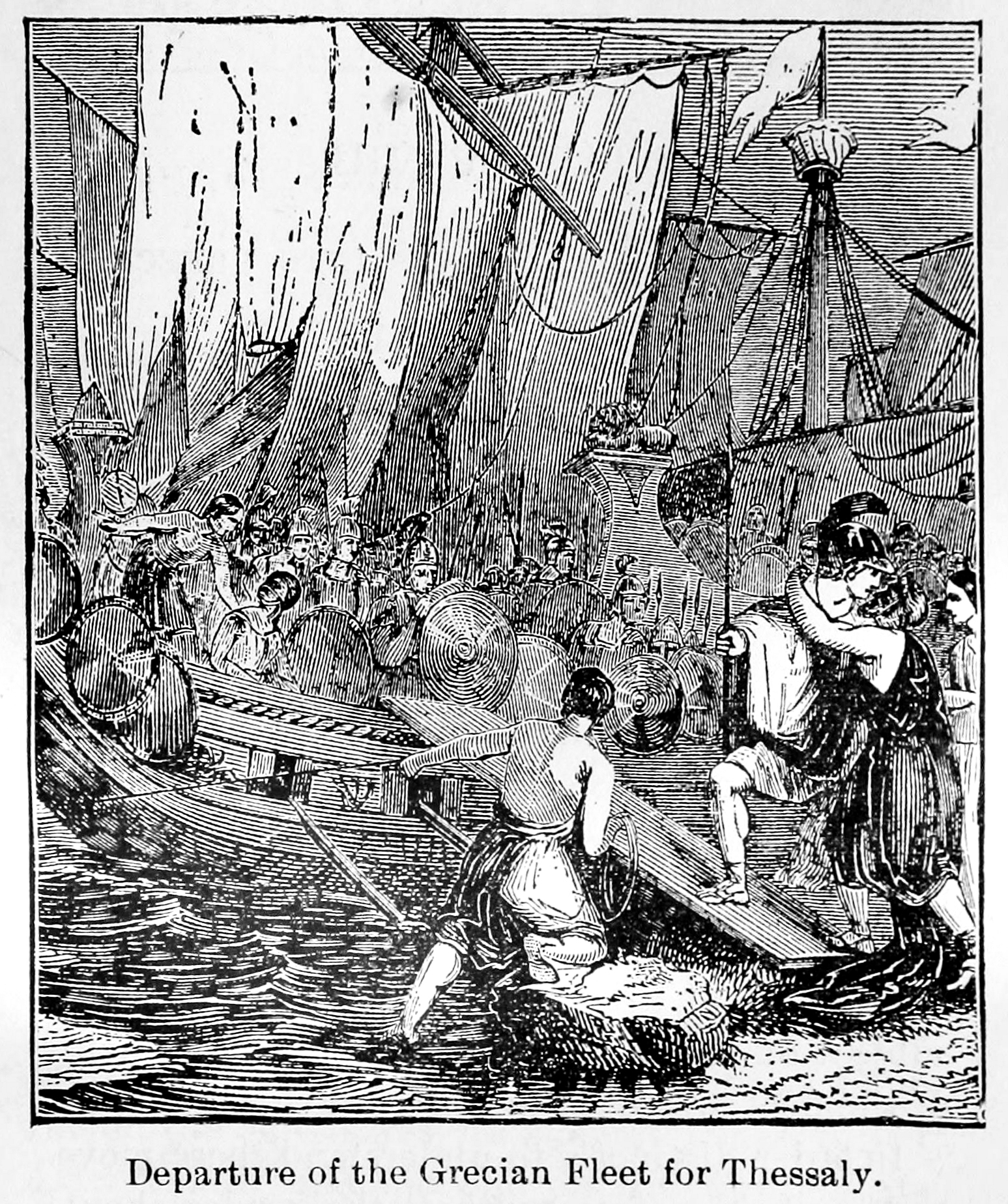
Departure of the Grecian fleet for Thessaly.

Around ten days later, the Persian army arrived at Thermopylae, and the Allies at Chalcis were informed by a ship, captained by Abronichus, which had been appointed to liaise between the army and the fleet. However, there was still no sign of the Persian fleet, and the first day the Persians spent at Thermopylae passed without them launching an attack. The next day, the Persian fleet finally drew near to Artemisium, heading for the Gap of Skiathos located between the coast of Magnesia and Skiathos, when a summer gale (a 'Hellesponter' – probably a north-easterly storm) broke, driving the Persian fleet onto the mountainous coast. The storm lasted two days, wrecking approximately one third of the Persian ships. Meanwhile, at Thermopylae, the Persians had continued to wait for the Greeks to disperse, also choosing not to attack during the storm.

The day after the storm finished, the Allied fleet returned to Artemisium to protect the flank of the army at Thermopylae. The following day, (the fifth since the Persians had arrived at Thermopylae) the Persian army began their attacks on the Allied army at Thermopylae. The same day, the Persian fleet finally appeared through the Gap of Sciathos, and began mooring on the coast opposite Artemisium, at Aphetae. According to Herodotus, 15 Persian ships blundered into the Allied lines, and were captured. Although clearly storm damaged, the Persian fleet still probably outnumbered the Allies by nearly 3:1. As a result, the Allies contemplated withdrawing completely. The Euboeans, not wanting to be abandoned to the Persians, bribed Themistocles to try to ensure that the Allied fleet remained. Since the joint operation at Thermopylae and Artemisium was his strategy in the first place, it is likely this is exactly what Themistocles wanted, and this bribe allowed him in turn to bribe the Spartan and Corinthian admirals, Eurybiades and Adeimantus to remain at Artemisium.

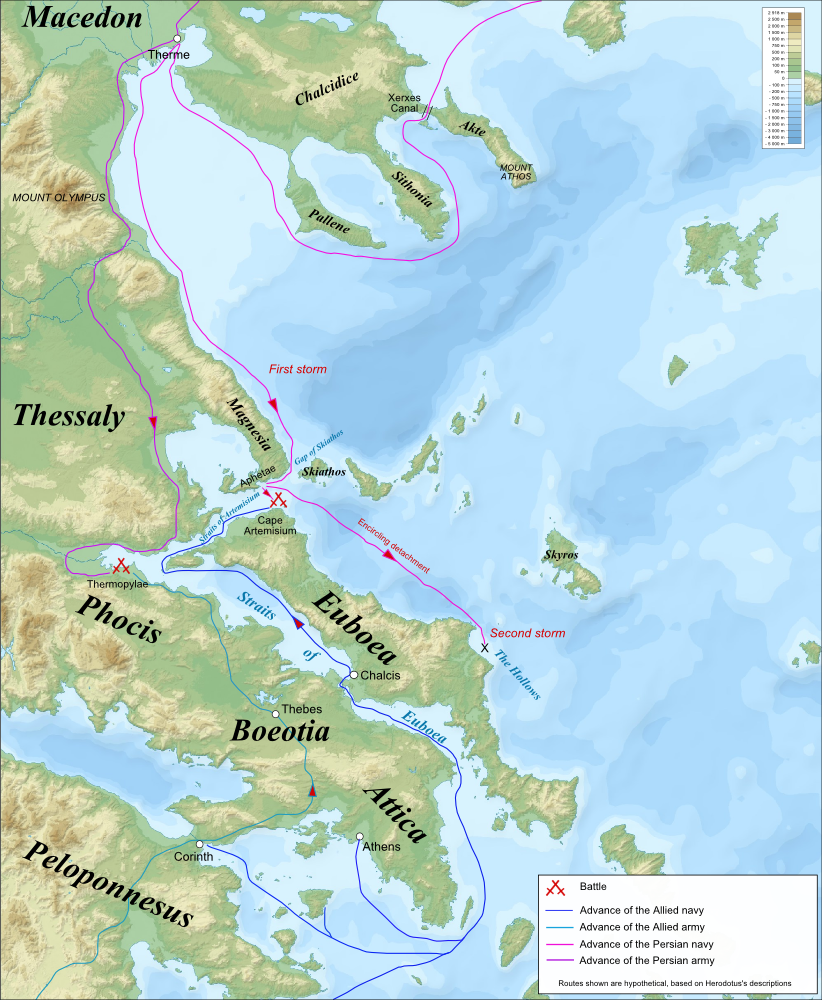
Map showing the Greek & Persian advances to Thermopylae and Artemisium.

Later on that day, a deserter from the Persian fleet, a Greek called Scyllias, swam into the Allied camp. He brought bad news for the Allies – whilst most of the Persian fleet was undergoing repairs, the Persians had detached 200 seaworthy ships to sail around the outer coast of Euboea, to block the escape route of the Allied fleet. The Persians did not want to attack the Allies yet, because they thought the Allies would simply flee, and so they sought to trap them. The Allies resolved to go and meet this detachment, to prevent being trapped, though they planned to leave by nightfall to prevent the Persians becoming aware of their plans.

The Allies most likely realised that this situation presented them with an opportunity to destroy an isolated part of the Persian fleet. Herodotus is not clear on where the Allies planned to meet this detachment, only that they resolved to do so. One possibility is that they planned to sail down the Straits of Euboea, and hope that the other Allied ships, patrolling the coast of Attica, followed the Persians as they entered the Straits of Euboea from the south; then the Persians might themselves be caught in a trap. Alternatively, the Allies may have planned to ambush the detachment as it passed by Artemisium, on its journey from Aphetae. Either way, they decided to make a demonstration towards the Persian lines during what remained of the day, to convince the Persians that they were planning to stay at Artemisium. Herodotus also suggests that this was an opportunity for them to assess Persian seamanship and tactics. The Allies probably waited until late afternoon so that there was little chance of being drawn into a full scale engagement; they did not want to suffer casualties before sailing to meet to the Persian detachment. These decisions finally led to the beginning of the battle.

=== Chronology ===
The exact chronology of the battles of Thermopylae and Artemisium, and their relation to each other is somewhat unclear. The chronology below represents an estimated reconstruction of the time-line, following Lazenby.

Day	Events
−15	Persian army leaves Therma
c. -13	Persian reconnaissance fleet arrives at Skiathos. Allies retreat to Chalcis.
−4	Persian army arrives at Thermopylae. Persian fleet leaves Therma.
−3	First day of the storm.
−2	Second day of the storm.
−1	Storm ends. Allied fleet returns to Artemisium.
1	First day of Persian attacks at Thermopylae. Persian fleet arrives at Artemisium. Persian detachment sent around Euboea. First engagement of the Battle of Artemisium.
2	Second day of both battles.
3	Third day of both battles. Rearguard at Thermopylae outflanked and destroyed.

== Opposing forces ==
=== Persian fleet ===
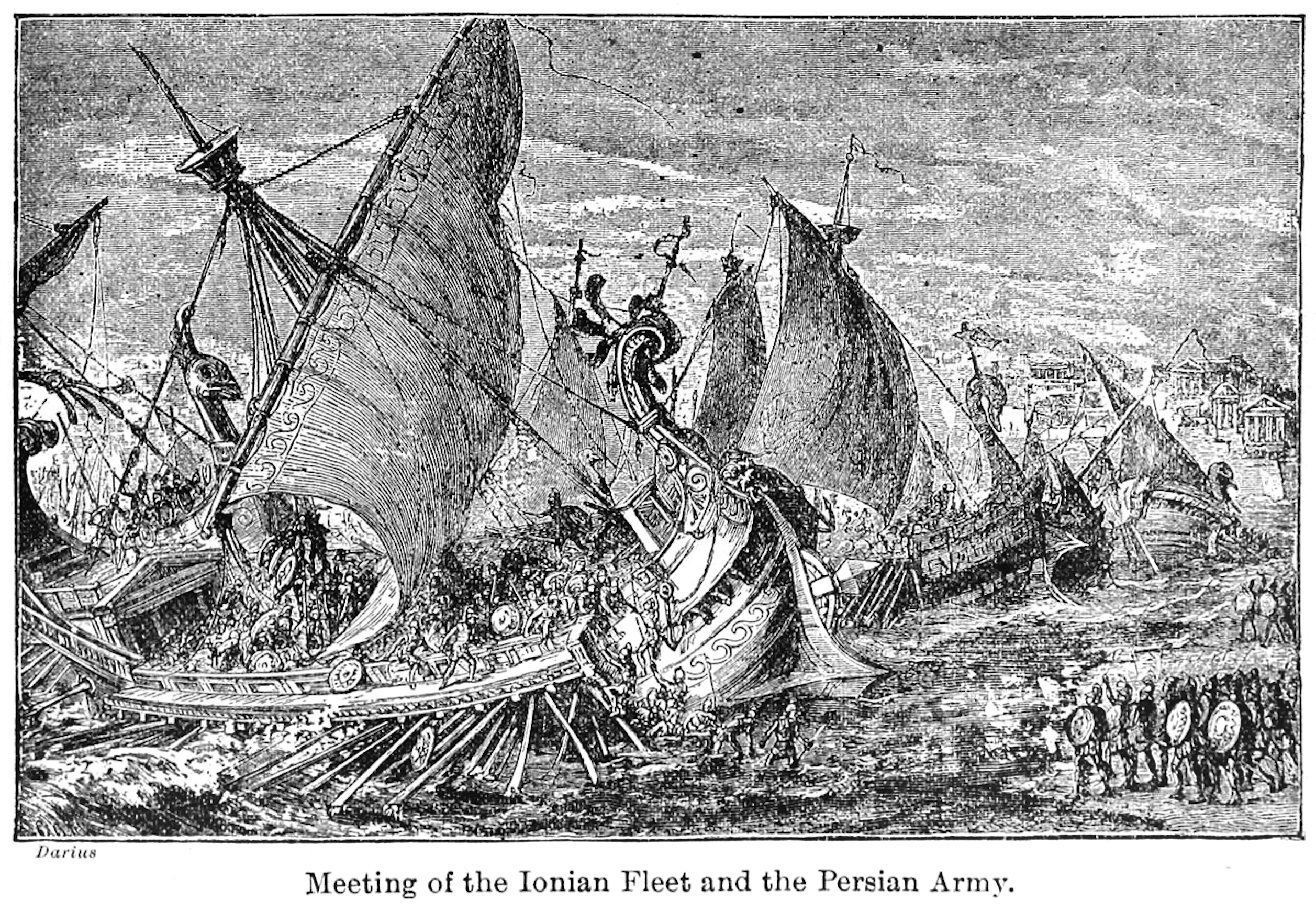
The Ionian fleet, here seen joining with Persian forces at the Bosphorus in preparation of the European Scythian campaign of Darius I in 513 BC, was part of the Achaemenid fleet at Artemisium. 19th century illustration.

Herodotus gives a detailed description of the Persian fleet that assembled at Doriskos in spring 480 BC (see table). However, after the fleet was struck the storm off the coast of Magnesia, approximately one third of the fleet was lost. Thus, by Herodotus's reckoning, the Persian fleet would have had approximately 800 triremes at Artemisium.

Region		Region		Region	Number of ships
Phoenicia and Syria	300	Egypt	200	Cyprus	150
Cilicia	100	Ionia	100	Pontus	100
Caria	70	Aeolia	60	Lycia	50
Pamphylia	30	Dorians from Asia Minor	30	Cyclades	17
				Total	1207

Some modern scholars have accepted these numbers, especially since the ancient sources are unusually consistent on this point. Other authors reject this number, with 1,207 being seen as more of a reference to the combined Greek fleet in the Iliad, and generally claim that the Persians could have launched no more than around 600 warships into the Aegean.

=== Greek fleet ===
Herodotus claims there were 280 ships in the Greek fleet at the Battle of Artemisium, made up of the following contingents (numbers in parentheses refer to Penteconters, other ships are all Triremes):

City	Ships	City	Ships	City	Ships
Athens	127	Corinth	40	Aegina	18
Chalcis	20	Megara	20	Sicyon	12
Sparta	10	Epidaurus	8	Eretria	7
Troezen	5	Styra	2	Ceos	2 (2)
Opuntian Locris	(7)			Total	271 (9)

The Athenians had been building up a large fleet since 483 BC, ostensibly for their ongoing conflict with Aegina. However, it is probable that this build up, initiated by Themistocles, was also made with a future conflict with the Persians in mind. The Athenians initially requested command of the Allied fleet, but let Eurybiades of Sparta command it to preserve unity.

== Strategic and tactical considerations ==
Strategically, the Allied mission was simple. The fleet needed to protect the flank of the army at Thermopylae, whilst not being cut off themselves. For the Persians, the strategic situation was equally simple, although with more options. They needed to force their way through either one of Thermopylae or Artemisium (since holding both was necessary for the Allied effort), or to outflank either position. Outflanking the Straits of Artemisium was theoretically much easier than outflanking Thermopylae, by sailing around the east coast of Euboea. The Greek position at Artemisium may have been chosen in order to watch for such attempts. If narrowness of the channel had been the only determinant, the Allies could have found a better position near the city of Histiaea.

The Persians were at a significant tactical advantage, outnumbering the Allies and having "better sailing" ships. The "better sailing" that Herodotus mentions was probably due to the superior seamanship of the crews; most of the Athenian ships (and therefore the majority of the fleet) were newly built, and had inexperienced crews. The most common naval tactics in the Mediterranean area at the time were ramming (triremes were equipped with a ram at the bows), or boarding by ship-borne marines (which essentially turned a sea battle into a land one). The Persians and Asiatic Greeks had by this time begun to use a manoeuver known as diekplous. It is not entirely clear what this was, but it probably involved sailing into gaps between enemy ships and then ramming them in the side. This maneuver would have required skilled sailing, and therefore the Persians would have been more likely to employ it. The Allies, however, developed tactics specifically to counter this.

Herodotus suggests that the Allied ships were heavier and, by implication, less maneuverable. Their weight would further reduce the likelihood of the Allied ships employing the diekplous. The source of this heaviness is uncertain; possibly the Allied ships were bulkier in construction. Another suggestion is that the heaviness was caused by the weight of fully armoured hoplite marines. The Allies may have had extra marines on board if their ships were less maneuverable, since boarding would then be the main tactic available to them (at the cost of making the ships even heavier). Indeed, Herodotus refers to the Greeks capturing ships, rather than sinking them.

== Battle ==
=== First day ===
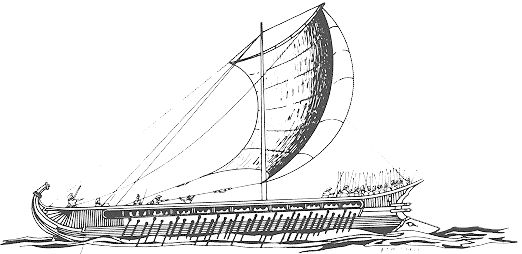
Sketch reconstruction of a Greek Trireme.

When the Persians saw the Allied fleet rowing towards them, they decided to seize the opportunity to attack, even though it was late in the day, as they thought they would win an easy victory. They quickly advanced on the much smaller Allied fleet. However, the Allies had come up with a tactic for this situation, where they turned their "bows on to the barbarians, [and] they drew their sterns together in the middle". This is usually taken to mean that they formed into a circle, with their rams pointing outwards; Thucydides reports that in the Peloponnesian War, Peloponnesian fleets twice adopted a circular formation, with their sterns together. However, Herodotus does not actually use the word circle, and Lazenby points out the difficulty of forming a circle of 250 ships (the Peloponnesian fleets had 30–40 ships). It is thus possible the Allies formed into more of a crescent formation, with the wings drawn back to prevent the Persian ships sailing around the Allied line. Whatever the case, it seems likely that this maneuver was intended to negate the superior Persian seamanship, and perhaps specifically the use of diekplous.

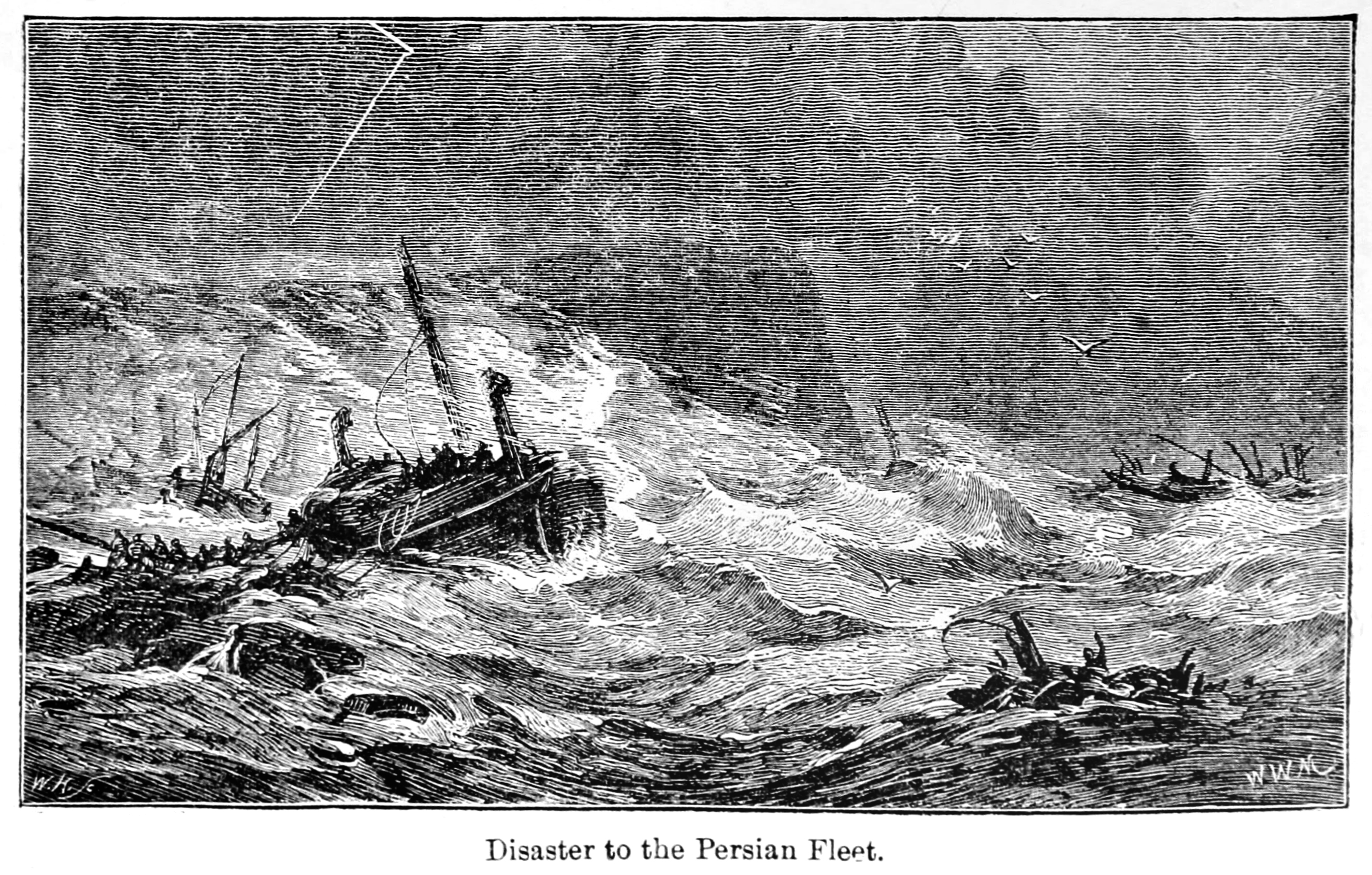
Disaster hits the Persian fleet off Euboea's eastern shore.

Having assumed this formation upon the giving of a prearranged signal, the Allied ships moved suddenly outwards from this position at a second signal, rowing into the Persian ships and catching them off guard. Their superior seamanship negated, the Persians came off worst from the encounter with 30 of their ships captured or sunk. During the battle a Persian ship, captained by Antidorus of Lemnos, defected to the Allies. Nightfall then ended the battle, with the Allies having fared better than they possibly expected to.

During the night, another storm broke (this time probably a thunder-storm, possibly with a south easterly wind), preventing the Allies from setting off southwards to counter the Persian detachment sent around the outside of Euboea. However, the storm also hit the Persian detachment of ships, driving them off course and onto the rocky coast of 'the Hollows' of Euboea. This part of the Persian fleet was thus also shipwrecked, losing most of the ships.

=== Second day ===
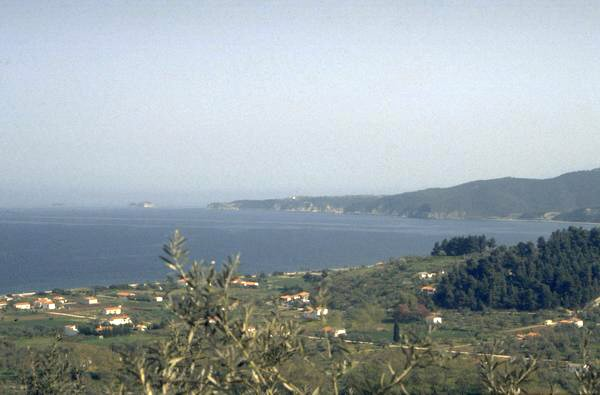
Euboea's eastern shore, the "Hollows", where a large part of the Achaemenid fleet was shipwrecked.

The following day (which was also the second day of the battle of Thermopylae) the Persian fleet, now recovering from the two storms, declined to attack the Allies, and instead attempted to make their fleet seaworthy again. News of the shipwreck off Euboea reached the Allies that day, as well as a reinforcement of 53 ships from Athens.

Again waiting until late afternoon, the Allies took the opportunity to attack a patrol of Cilician ships, destroying them, before retreating as night fell. These ships were possibly survivors of the wrecked detachment sent around Euboea, or were perhaps anchored in an isolated harbour.

=== Third day ===
On the third day of the battle the Persian fleet was ready to attack the Allied lines in full force. Seeing the Persian fleet assemble, the Allies attempted to block the Straits of Artemisium as best they could, and waited for the Persians to attack. The Persians formed their ships into a semicircle and tried to enclose the Allied fleet, upon which the Allies rowed forward and joined battle. The battle raged all day long, with the Allies hard put to defend their line. When the fleets finally disengaged at nightfall, both sides had suffered roughly equal losses. However, the smaller Allied fleet could scarcely afford such losses; half the Athenian ships (the largest contingent in the fleet) were damaged or lost.

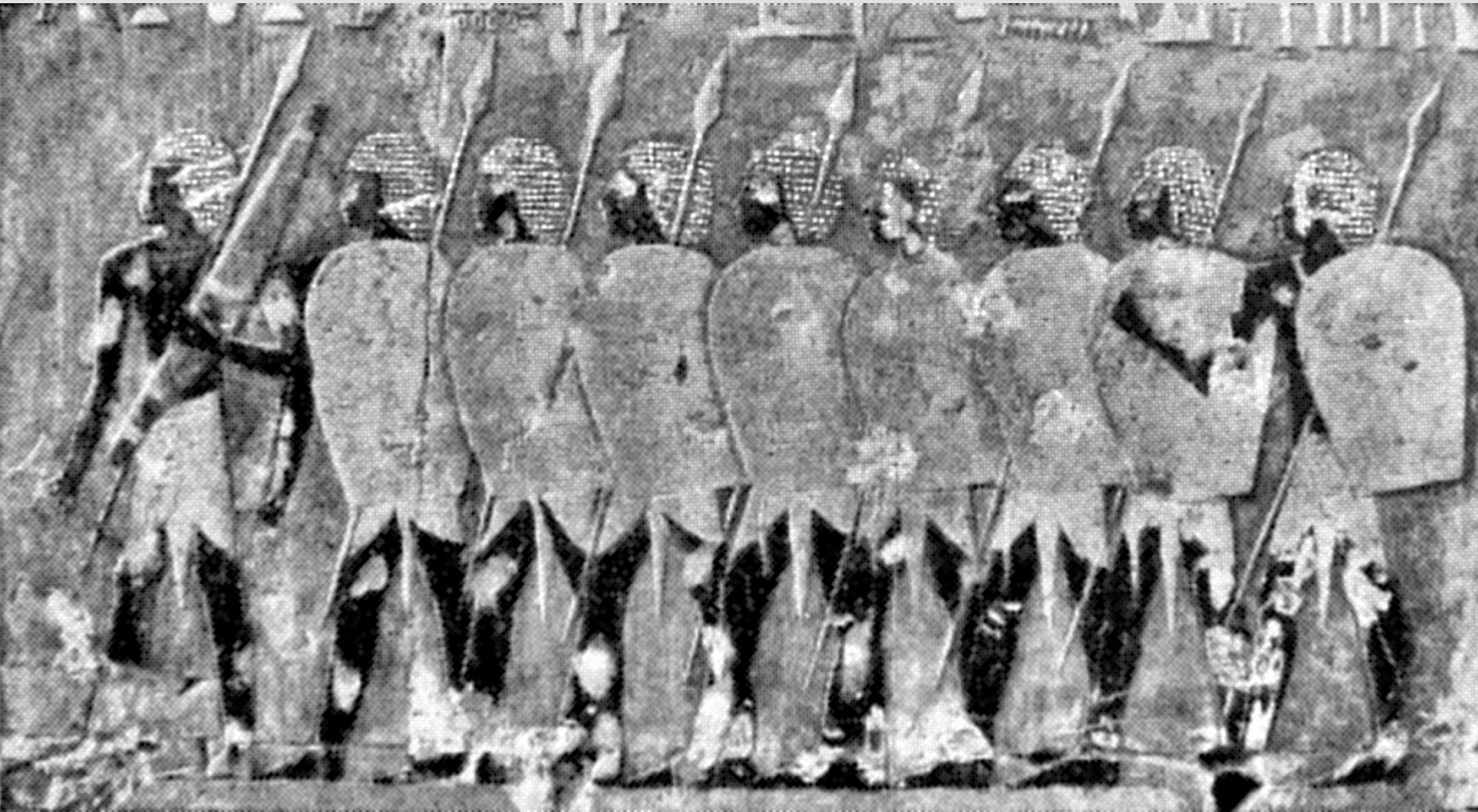
The heavily equipped Egyptians fought successfully against the Greek hoplites.

According to Herodotus, the Athenians were the best fighters on the Allied side. On the Achaemenid side, the best results had been achieved by the Egyptians, who wore a heavy individual equipment comparable to Greek hoplites, and were able to vanquish five Greek ships:

In that sea‑fight of all Xerxes' fighters the Egyptians bore themselves best; besides other great feats of arms that they achieved, they took five Greek ships and their crews withal. Of the Greeks on that day the Athenians bore themselves best; and of the Athenians Clinias son of Alcibiades; he brought to the war two hundred men and a ship of his own, all at his private charges.

— Herodotus 8.17.

Returning to Artemisium, the Allies saw that they would probably not be able to hold the line for another day, such were their losses. They thus debated whether they should withdraw from Artemisium, whilst they awaited news from Thermopylae. Themistocles ordered the men to slaughter and barbecue the flocks of the Euboeans, so that they would not fall into Persian hands. Abronichus arrived on the liaison ship from Thermopylae and told the Allies of the destruction of the Allied rearguard at Thermopylae. Since holding the Straits of Artemisium now no longer held any strategic purpose, and given their losses, the Allies decided to evacuate immediately.

== Aftermath ==
Ionians and Carians
of the Achaemenid army

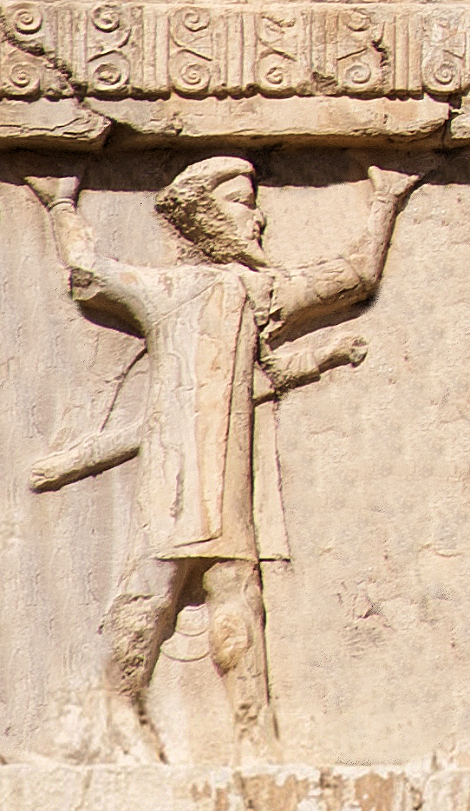
Ionians

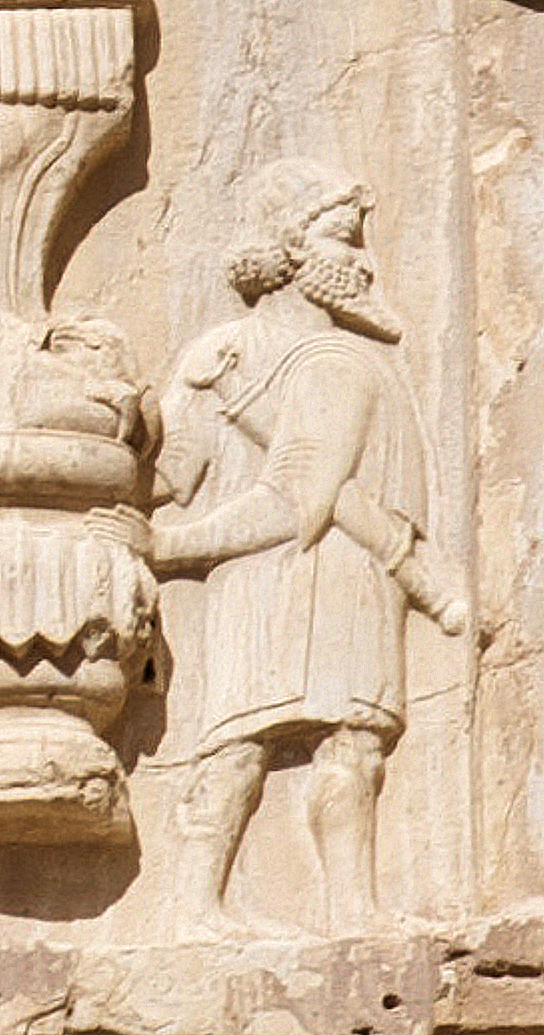
Carians

The Asiatic Greeks in the Persian army, illustrated in the list of troops by ethnicity, on the tomb of Xerxes I at Naqsh-e Rostam.

The Persians were alerted to the withdrawal of the Greeks by a boat from Histiaea, but did not at first believe it. They sent some ships to see if this was the case, and finding that it was, the whole fleet set sail for Artemisium in the morning. The Persians then sailed on to Histiaea and sacked the surrounding region.

The Allied fleet sailed to Salamis, off the coast of Attica, to assist with the evacuation of the remaining Athenians. En route, Themistocles left inscriptions addressed to the Ionian Greek crews of the Persian fleet on all springs of water that they might stop at, asking them to defect to the Allied cause:

Men of Ionia, that what you are doing is not proper, campaigning against your fathers and wishing to enslave Greece. It would be best if you came on our side. But if this is not possible, at least during the battle stand aside and also beg the Carians to do the same with you. But if you can not do either the one or the other, if you are chained by higher force and you can not defect during the operations, when we come at hand, act purposely as cowards remembering that we are of the same blood and that the first cause of animosity with the barbarians came from you.

Following Thermopylae, the Persian army burned and sacked the Boeotian cities that had not submitted to them—Plataea and Thespiae—and then marched on the now evacuated city of Athens. Meanwhile, the Allies (for the most part Peloponnesian) prepared to defend the Isthmus of Corinth, demolishing the single road that led through it, and building a wall across it. As at Thermopylae, to make this an effective strategy required the Allied navy to stage a simultaneous blockade, barring the passage of the Persian navy across the Saronic Gulf, so that troops could not be landed directly on the Peloponnese. However, instead of a mere blockade, Themistocles persuaded the Allies to seek a decisive victory against the Persian fleet. Luring the Persian navy into the Straits of Salamis in September, the Allied fleet was able to destroy much of the Persian fleet, which essentially ended the threat to the Peloponnese.

Fearing that the Greeks might attack the bridges across the Hellespont and trap his army in Europe, Xerxes retreated with much of the army back to Asia. He left a hand picked force under Mardonius to complete the conquest the following year. However, under pressure from the Athenians, the Peloponnesian Allies eventually agreed to try to force Mardonius to battle, and marched on Attica. Mardonius withdrew to Boeotia to lure the Greeks into open terrain and the two sides eventually met near the city of Plataea. There, at the Battle of Plataea in August 479 BC, the Greek army won a decisive victory, destroying much of the Persian army, and ending the invasion of Greece. Meanwhile, at the near-simultaneous naval Battle of Mycale the Greeks destroyed much of the remaining Persian fleet, thereby reducing the threat of further invasions.

=== Spoils ===
The archaeologist Werner Gauer had posited that loot was captured after the battle. The historian Jan van Rookhuijzen says that the capture of loot is not confirmed, but makes note of Herodotus listing multiple details about the Persian armor in his account. The people of Peparethus had captured two Carian warships, possibly during the aftermath of the battle. Gauer, however, argues that the seizure of these two ships took place at the time of the Persian retreat from Greece.

== Topography ==
The Myrmex reef mentioned by Herodotus has been identified with the modern Lefkari reef.

== Historiography ==
Considered by itself, Artemisium was a relatively insignificant battle. The Allies did not defeat the Persian navy, nor prevent it from advancing further along the coast of Greece. Conversely, neither did the Persians destroy the Greek fleet, nor irreparably weaken it. The battle was thus an indecisive one, which pleased neither side.

Nevertheless, in the wider context of the Greco-Persian wars, it was a very significant battle for the Allies. The Allies had demonstrated to themselves that they could stand up to the Persian navy, even having the better of some encounters. For many of the Allied crews, it was their first taste of battle, and the experience gained was invaluable at the forthcoming Battle of Salamis. Moreover, fighting the Persians at Artemisium allowed the Greek admirals to see how the Persian fleet performed, and gave them insights into how it might be beaten. In addition, the events before and during Artemisium were crucial in cutting down the size of the Persian fleet (even if this was not all due to military action), meaning that the odds faced by the Allies at the Battle of Salamis were not overwhelming.

The Athenian poet Pindar had said that Artemisium was "where the sons of the Athenians laid the shining foundation-stone of freedom". Plutarch would quote Pindar to say that Athenians took pride in the battle of Artemisium. In his work De Herodoti malignitate (the lies of Herodotus), Plutarch finds a fault with the account of Artemisium given by Herodotus: the latter had understated the achievements of the Athenians. The battle was mentioned by Aristophanes in his work Lysistrata, and by Isocrates in his work Panegyricus. Simonides of Ceos had written a poem on Artemisium, with allusions to the abduction of the Athenian princess Oreithyia by the wind god Boreas.

== See also ==
- Hydna of Scione, Greek diver said to have sunk the Persian fleet at Artemisium

== Bibliography ==
=== Theses and research papers ===
- Gongaki, Konstantina; Preka-Papadema, Panagiota; Kalachanis, Konstantinos; Antonopoulos, Panagiotis (2021). "Astronomical Calculation[s] [for] the Dating [of] the Historical Battles of Marathon, Thermopylae and Salamis Based on Herodotus' Description". Scientific Culture. 7 (2): 81–99. doi:10.5281/zenodo.4465552.
- van Rookhuijzen, Jan Zacharias (2018). Where Xerxes' Throne Once Stood: Gazing with Herodotus at the Persian Invasion in the Landscapes of Greece and Anatolia (PDF) (PhD thesis). Radboud Universiteit Nijmegen. hdl:2066/182830. ISBN 9789462338586. Archived from the original (PDF) on 7 August 2024.
- Young Jr., Theodore Cuyler (1980). "480/479 B.C. - A Persian Perspective". Iranica Antiqua. 15: 213–239. eISSN 1783-1482. ProQuest 1297864529.

=== Modern sources ===
- Balcer, Jack Martin (1995). Schuller, Wolfgang (ed.). The Persian Conquest of the Greeks 545 - 450 BC. XENIA. Konstanzer Althistorische Vortrage und Forschungen. Vol. 38. Universitatsverlag Konstanz. ISBN 9783879404896. ISSN 0936-8663.
- Burn, Andrew Robert (1984). Persia and the Greeks. The Defence of the West, c. 546-478 B. C. (2nd ed.). Gerald Duckworth & Co. ISBN 9780715617113.
- Bury, John Bagnell (2015). A History of Greece. To the Death of Alexander the Great (Digital ed.). Cambridge University Press. ISBN 9781108082204.
- Cawkwell, George (2005). The Greek Wars: The Failure of Persia. Oxford University Press. doi:10.1093/oso/9780198148715.001.0001. ISBN 9780198148715.
- Dandamaev, M. A. (1989). A Political History of the Achaemenid Empire. Translated by Vogelsang, Willem J. E. J. Brill. doi:10.1163/9789004667631. ISBN 9789004667631. S2CID 160052824.
- Fehling, Detlev (1971). Die Quellenangaben bei Herodot: Studien zur Erzählkunst Herodots [The Sources of Herodotus: Studies of Herodotus' Narrative Art]. Untersuchungen zur antiken Literatur und Geschichte [Studies in Ancient Literature and History] (in German). Vol. 9. De Gruyter. doi:10.1515/9783110841930. ISBN 9783110036343.
- Green, Peter (1996). The Greco-Persian Wars. University of California Press. doi:10.1525/9780520917064. ISBN 9780520203136.
- Hignett, Charles (1963). Xerxes' Invasion of Greece. Clarendon Press. ISBN 9780198142478.
- Immerwahr, Henry R. (1966). Form and Thought in Herodotus. Philological Monographs. Vol. 23. American Philological Association. ISBN 9780891304784.
- Lazenby, John Francis (1993). The Defence of Greece, 490-479 B.C. Aris & Phillips. ISBN 9780856685910.
- Mikalson, Jon D. (2003). Herodotus and Religion in the Persian Wars. University of North Carolina Press. ISBN 9780807827987.
- Rahe, Paul (2015). The Grand Strategy of Classical Sparta: The Persian Challenge. Yale Library of Military History. Yale University Press. doi:10.12987/9780300218602. ISBN 978-0-300-11642-7. JSTOR j.ctvmd857x.
- Roisman, Joseph; Worthington, Ian (2011). A Companion to Ancient Macedonia. Blackwell Companions to the Ancient World. John Wiley & Sons. doi:10.1002/9781444327519. ISBN 9781444351637.
- Shepherd, William (2012). Plataea 479 BC: The Most Glorious Victory Ever Seen. Osprey Campaign Series. Vol. 239. Osprey Publishing. ISBN 9781849085540.
- Smith, Jeffrey A. (2021). Themistocles: The Powerbroker of Athens. Pen & Sword Military. ISBN 978-1526790453.
- Wallinga, H. T. (2005). Xerxes’ Greek Adventure: The Naval Perspective. Mnemosyne Supplements. Vol. 264. Brill. doi:10.1163/9789047406549. ISBN 9789004141407. ISSN 0169-8958.

=== Book chapters ===
- Burn, Andrew Robert (1985). "Persia and the Greeks". In Gershevitch, Ilya (ed.). The Cambridge History of Iran. Vol. 2: The Median and Achaemenid Periods. Cambridge University Press. pp. 292–391. doi:10.1017/CHOL9780521200912.007. ISBN 9780521200912.
- Lupi, Marcello (2017). "Sparta and the Persian Wars, 499–478". In Powell, Anton (ed.). A Companion to Sparta. John Wiley & Sons. pp. 269–290. doi:10.1002/9781119072379.ch10. ISBN 9781405188692.
