= Antidorus of Lemnos =

5th century BCE Greek soldier

Antidorus (Ancient Greek: Ἀντίδωρος) of Lemnos was a soldier of classical antiquity who fought on the Persian side in the Battle of Artemisium in the 5th century BCE. He deserted with his ship to the side of the Greeks during the battle. He was the first of the trierarchs in the Persian fleet to change sides to the Greeks.

Antidorus was rewarded for this by the Athenians with a piece of ground in Salamis.
