= Damasithymus =

King of Calyndos, Caria (died 480 BC)

- King of Calyndos
- Born: Calynda (modern-day Kozpınar, Bozüyük, Bilecik, Turkey)
- Died: 26 or 27 September 480 BC; Salamis Island, Greece
- Greek: Δαμασίθυμος
- Father: Candaules (Κανδαύλης)

Damasithymus (/ˌdæməˈsɪθɪməs/; Greek: Δαμασίθυμος; died 480 BC) was the king of Calyndos (Greek: Κάλυνδος), a city in ancient Caria. His father was Candaules (Greek: Κανδαύλης).

He is mentioned by Herodotus in the seventh and eighth books of his Histories, and by Polyaenus in the eighth book of Stratagems.

Damasithymus was an ally of Xerxes I at the Second Persian invasion of Greece. He fought at the naval Battles of Artemisium and Salamis in 480 BC. He participated as commander of the only Calyndian ship in the Persian navy. He was killed during the Battle of Salamis.

His ship, together with ships from Halicarnassus, Cos and Nisyros, were under the command of Artemisia. Herodotus mentions that Damasithymus was one of the most noted of the men commanding the Persian ships.

He was killed at the Battle of Salamis when Artemisia rammed his ship, although they were allies, because it is said that she wanted to escape from an Athenian ship under the command of Ameinias who was pursuing her. Damasithymus's ship sank and he and all his crew were lost. When Xerxes saw Artemisia sink Damasithymus's ship, he thought that she had sunk a Greek ship and, according to Herodotus, he said: "My men have become women, and my women men." But, according to Polyaenus, he said: "O Zeus, surely you have formed women out of man's materials, and men out of woman's."

According to Herodotus, Artemisia had previously had a disagreement with Damasithymus while they were in the Hellespont. "Now, even though it be true that she had had some strife with him before, while they were still about the Hellespont, yet I am not able to say whether she did this by intention, or whether the Calyndian ship happened by chance to fall in her way."

== See also ==
- Second Persian invasion of Greece
