= Ariabignes =

Persian admiral and prince (died 480 BC)

- Old Persian: Ariyabigna; Greek: Ἀριαβίγνης
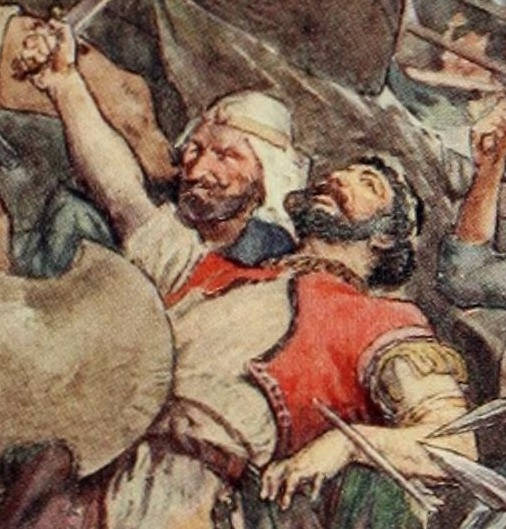
- Ariabignes' death depicted in William Rainey's Death of the Persian Admiral at Salamis (1910)
- Died: September 480 BC; Straits of Salamis, Greece
- Father: Darius I
- Relatives: Xerxes I (brother); Gobryas (grandfather)
- Military career
- Allegiance: Achaemenid Empire
- Rank: Admiral
- Conflicts: Second Persian invasion of Greece, Battle of Salamis

Ariabignes (Old Persian: Ariyabigna, Greek: Ἀριαβίγνης) was one of the sons of the Persian king Darius I and his mother was a daughter of Gobryas (Γοβρύας). He participated in the Second Persian invasion of Greece, as one of the four admirals of the fleet of his brother Xerxes I, and was killed in the Battle of Salamis in 480 BC. Ariabignes was the commander of the Carian and Ionian forces.

== Life ==
Plutarch calls him, Ariamenes (Ἀριαμένης), and speaks of him as a brave man and the most just of the brothers of Xerxes. The same writer relates that this Ariamenes laid claim to the throne on the death of Darius, as the eldest of his sons, but was opposed by Xerxes, who maintained that he had a right to the crown as the eldest of the sons born after Darius had become king.

The Persians appointed Artabanus to decide the dispute; and upon his declaring in favour of Xerxes, Ariamenes immediately saluted his brother as king, and was treated by him with great respect. According to Herodotus who calls the eldest son of Darius, Artabazanes (Ἀρταβαζάνης), this dispute, and its resolution, occurred while Darius I was still alive.

Plutarch also says that the men who killed him, during the Battle of Salamis, were Ameinias of Decelea (according to Herodotus he was from Pallene) and Socles (Σωκλῆς) of Pallene, when they hit him with their spears while he was trying to board on their ship and threw his body to the sea. In addition, he says that it was Artemisia who recognized his body floating among the shipwrecks and brought it back to Xerxes.

== Sources ==
- Herodotus, The Histories
- Plutarch, Parallel Lives, Themistocles
