= Battle of Salamis =

480 BC naval battle of the Greco-Persian Wars

- Part of the Second Persian invasion of Greece
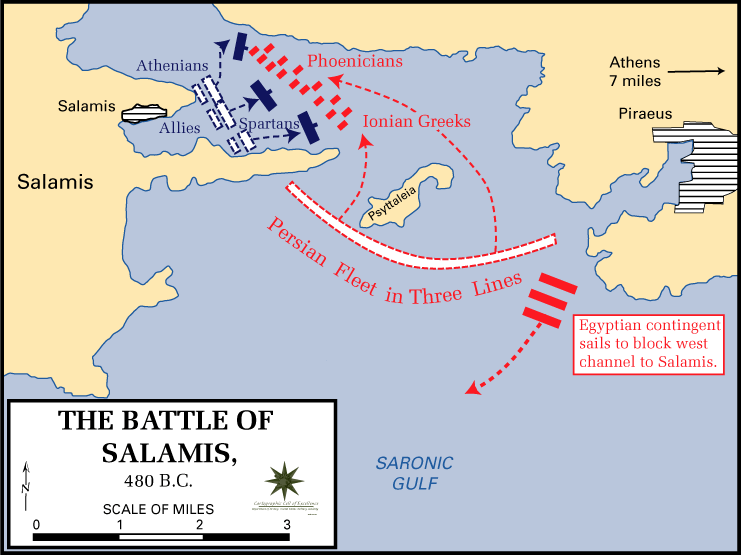
- A map depicting the major areas of conflict during the Battle of Salamis
Date	26 or 27 September, 480 BC
Location	Straits of Salamis 37°57′5″N 23°34′0″E
Result	Greek victory
Territorial changes	Persian army forced to withdraw from Attica, including the city of Athens

Belligerents
Athens; Sparta; Corinth; Aegina other Greek city-states	Achaemenid Empire

Commanders and leaders
Themistocles; Eurybiades	Xerxes I of Persia; Tetramnestos; Artemisia I of Caria; Achaemenes; Ariabignes †; Damasithymos †

Strength
371–378 ships (Note: Herodotus gives 378 ships of the alliance, but his numbers add up to 371.)	~900–1,207 ships (Note: As suggested by several ancient sources); Modern estimates: 400–800 ships (Note: 600–800; 400–700)

Casualties and losses
40 ships	300 ships
- Location of the naval battle of Salamis within modern Greece

The Battle of Salamis (/ˈsæləmɪs/ SAL-ə-miss) was a naval battle fought in 480 BC, between an alliance of Greek city-states under Themistocles, and the Achaemenid Empire under King Xerxes. It resulted in a victory for the outnumbered Greeks.

The battle was fought in the straits between the mainland and Salamis, an island in the Saronic Gulf near Athens, and marked the high point of the second Persian invasion of Greece. It was arguably the largest naval battle of the ancient world, and marked a turning point in the invasion.

To block the Persian advance, a small force of Greeks blocked the pass of Thermopylae, while an Athenian-dominated allied navy engaged the Persian fleet in the nearby straits of Artemisium. In the resulting Battle of Thermopylae, the Spartan rearguard of the Greek force was annihilated, while in the Battle of Artemisium the Greeks suffered heavy losses and retreated after the loss at Thermopylae. This allowed the Persians to conquer Phocis, Boeotia, Attica and Euboea. The allies prepared to defend the Isthmus of Corinth while the fleet was withdrawn to nearby Salamis Island.

Although heavily outnumbered, the Greeks were persuaded by Athenian general Themistocles to bring the Persian fleet to battle again, in the hope that a victory would prevent naval operations against the Peloponnese. Persian king Xerxes was also eager for a decisive battle. As a result of subterfuge on the part of Themistocles (which included a message directly sent to Xerxes letting him know that much of the Greek fleet was stationed at Salamis), the Persian navy rowed into the Straits of Salamis and tried to block both entrances. In the cramped waters, the great Persian numbers were an active hindrance, as ships struggled to maneuver and became disorganized. Seizing the opportunity, the Greek fleet formed in line and achieved a victory.

Xerxes retreated to Asia with much of his army, leaving Mardonius to complete the conquest of Greece. The following year the remainder of the Persian army was defeated at the Battle of Plataea and the Persian navy at the Battle of Mycale. The Persians made no further attempts to conquer the Greek mainland. The battles of Salamis and Plataea thus mark a turning point in the course of the Greco-Persian Wars as a whole; from then onward, the Greek poleis would take the offensive.

== Background ==
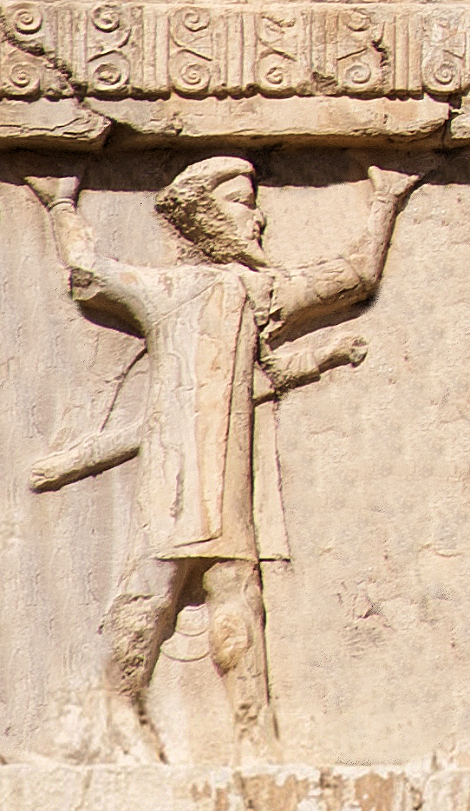
Ionian soldier (Old Persian cuneiform 𐎹𐎢𐎴, Yaunā) of the Achaemenid army, c. 480 BC. Xerxes I tomb relief.

The Greek city-states of Athens and Eretria had supported the unsuccessful Ionian Revolt against the Persian Empire of Darius I in 499-494 BC, led by the satrap of Miletus, Aristagoras. The Persian Empire was still relatively young, and prone to revolts amongst its subject peoples. Moreover, Darius was a usurper, and had spent considerable time extinguishing revolts against his rule. The Ionian revolt threatened the integrity of his empire, and Darius thus vowed to punish those involved (especially those not already part of the empire). Darius also saw the opportunity to expand his empire into the fractious world of Ancient Greece. A preliminary expedition under Mardonius, in 492 BC, to secure the land approaches to Greece ended with the conquest of Thrace and forced Macedon to become a client kingdom of Persia.

In 491 BC, Darius sent emissaries to all the Greek city-states, asking for a gift of 'earth and water' in token of their submission to him. Having had a demonstration of his power the previous year, the majority of the Greek cities duly obliged. In Athens, however, the ambassadors were put on trial and then executed; in Sparta, they were simply thrown down a well. This meant that Sparta was also now effectively at war with Persia.

Darius thus put together an amphibious task force under Datis and Artaphernes in 490 BC, which attacked Naxos, before receiving the submission of the other Cycladic Islands. The task force then moved on Eretria, which it besieged and destroyed. Finally, it moved to attack Athens, landing at the bay of Marathon, where it was met by a heavily outnumbered Athenian army. At the ensuing Battle of Marathon, the Athenians won a remarkable victory, which resulted in the withdrawal of the Persian army to Asia.

Map showing the Greek world at the time of the battle

Darius therefore began raising a huge new army with which he meant to completely subjugate Greece; however, in 486 BC, his Egyptian subjects revolted, indefinitely postponing any Greek expedition. Darius then died whilst preparing to march on Egypt, and the throne of Persia passed to his son Xerxes I. Xerxes crushed the Egyptian revolt, and very quickly restarted the preparations for the invasion of Greece. Since this was to be a full-scale invasion, it required long-term planning, stock-piling and conscription. Xerxes decided that the Hellespont would be bridged to allow his army to cross to Europe, and that a canal should be dug across the isthmus of Mount Athos (rounding which headland, a Persian fleet had been destroyed in 492 BC). These were both feats of exceptional ambition, which would have been beyond any other contemporary state. By early 480 BC, the preparations were complete, and the army which Xerxes had mustered at Sardis marched towards Europe, crossing the Hellespont on two pontoon bridges.

The Athenians had also been preparing for war with the Persians since the mid-480s BC, and in 482 BC the decision was taken, under the guidance of the Athenian politician Themistocles, to build a massive fleet of triremes that would be necessary for the Greeks to fight the Persians. However, the Athenians did not have the manpower to fight on land and sea; and therefore combatting the Persians would require an alliance of Greek city states. In 481 BC, Xerxes sent ambassadors around Greece asking for earth and water, but made the very deliberate omission of Athens and Sparta. Support thus began to coalesce around these two leading states. A congress of city states met at Corinth in late autumn of 481 BC, and a confederate alliance of Greek city-states was formed. It had the power to send envoys asking for assistance and to dispatch troops from the member states to defensive points after joint consultation. This was remarkable for the disjointed Greek world, especially since many of the city-states in attendance were still technically at war with each other.

Initially the 'congress' agreed to defend the narrow Vale of Tempe, on the borders of Thessaly, and thereby block Xerxes's advance. However, once there, they were warned by Alexander I of Macedon that the vale could be bypassed through the pass by the modern village of Sarantaporo, and that the army of Xerxes was overwhelming, so the Greeks retreated. Shortly afterward, they received the news that Xerxes had crossed the Hellespont. A second strategy was therefore adopted by the allies. The route to southern Greece (Boeotia, Attica and the Peloponnese) would require the army of Xerxes to travel through the very narrow pass of Thermopylae. This could easily be blocked by the Greek hoplites, despite the overwhelming numbers of Persians. Furthermore, to prevent the Persians bypassing Thermopylae by sea, the Athenian and allied navies could block the straits of Artemisium. This dual strategy was adopted by the congress. However, the Peloponnesian cities made fall-back plans to defend the Isthmus of Corinth should it come to it, whilst the women and children of Athens had been evacuated en masse to the Peloponnesian city of Troezen.

Famously, the much smaller Greek army led by the Spartan king Leonidas held the pass of Thermopylae against the Persians for three days before being outflanked by a mountain path. Much of the Greek army retreated, before the Spartans and Thespians who had continued to block the pass were surrounded and killed. The simultaneous Battle of Artemisium was up to that point a stalemate; however, when news of Thermopylae reached them, the Allied fleet also retreated, since holding the straits of Artemisium was now a moot point.

== Prelude ==
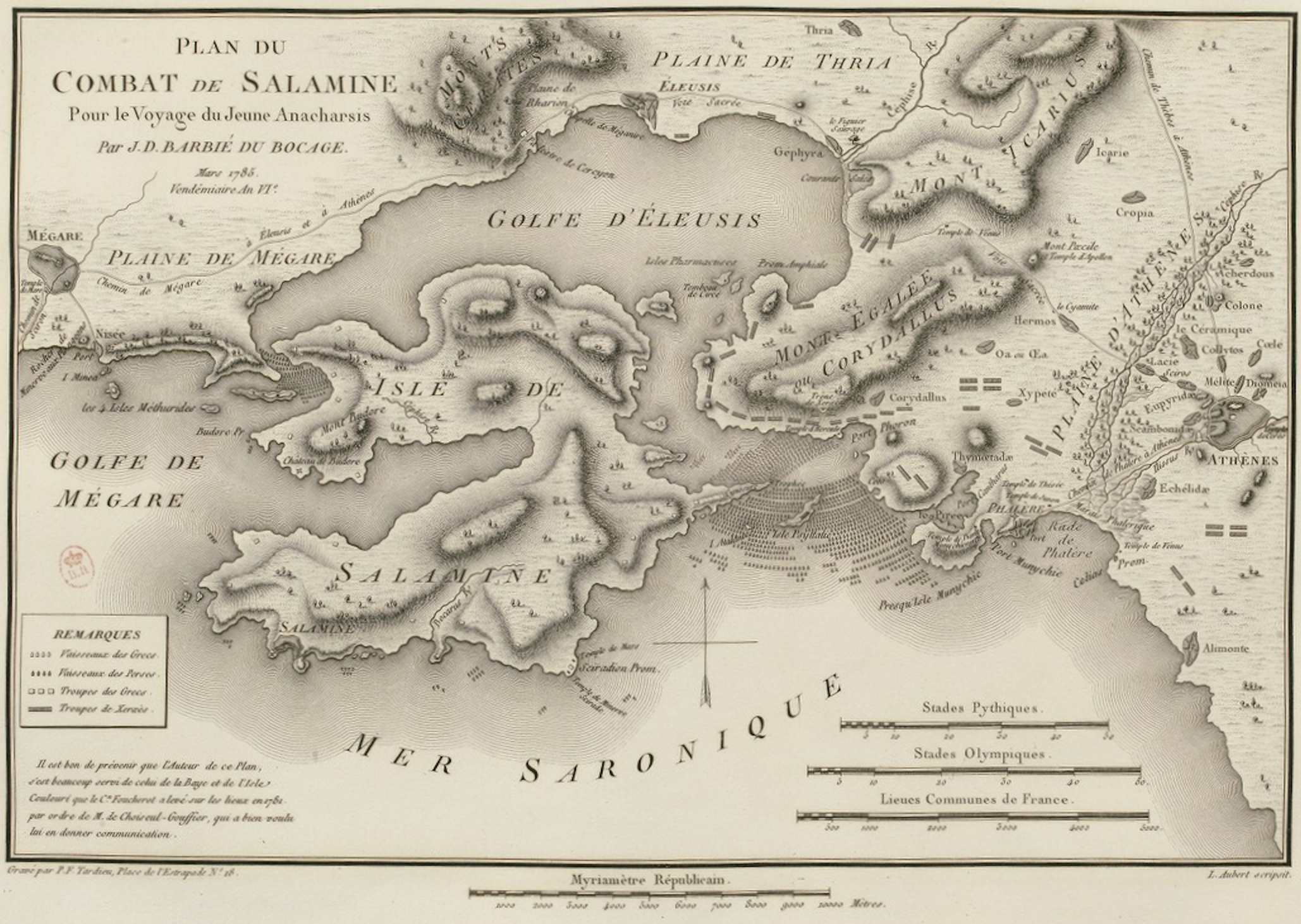
Battle of Salamis, 1785 engraving

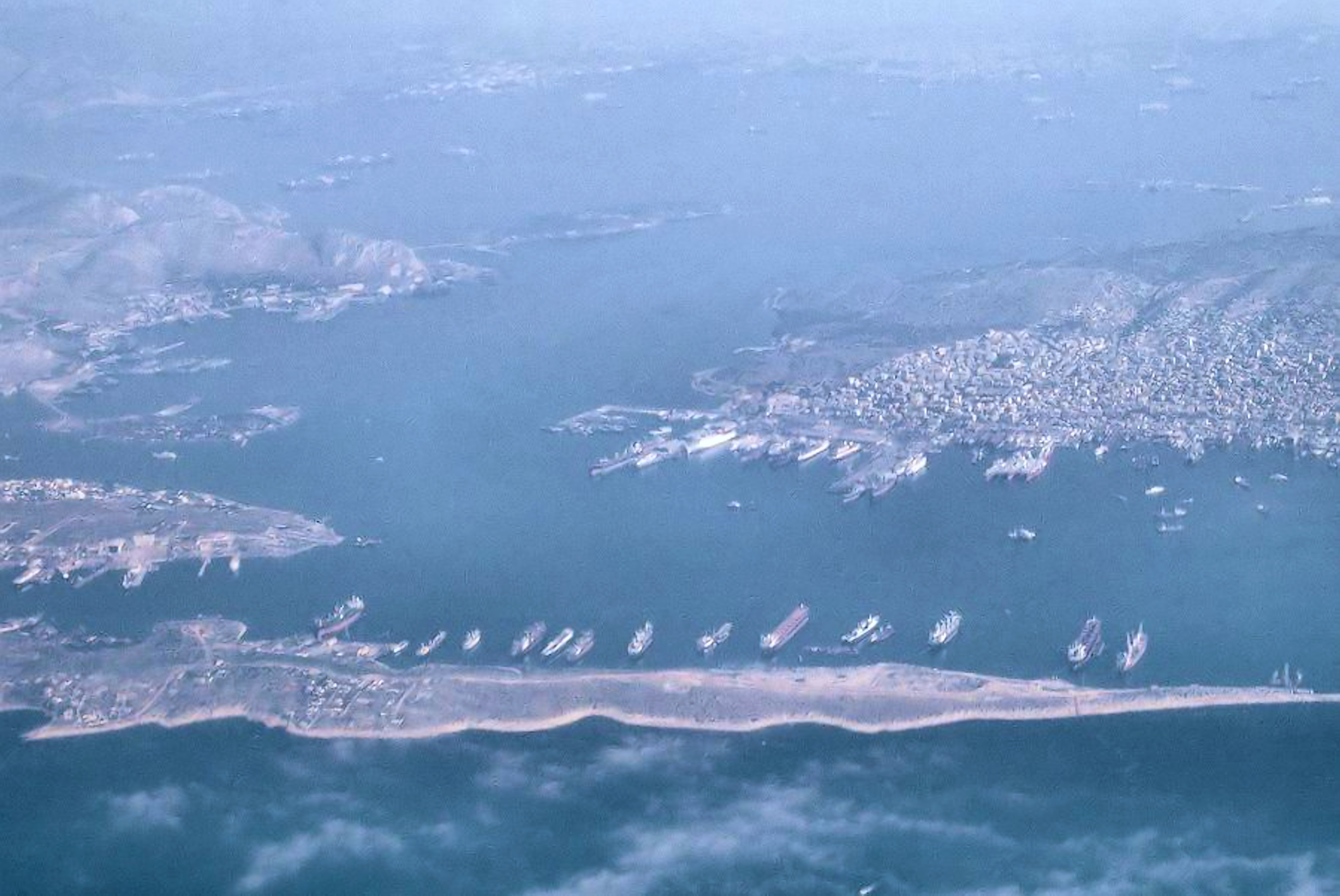
Modern view of the strait of Salamis, where the battle took place. Seen from the south.

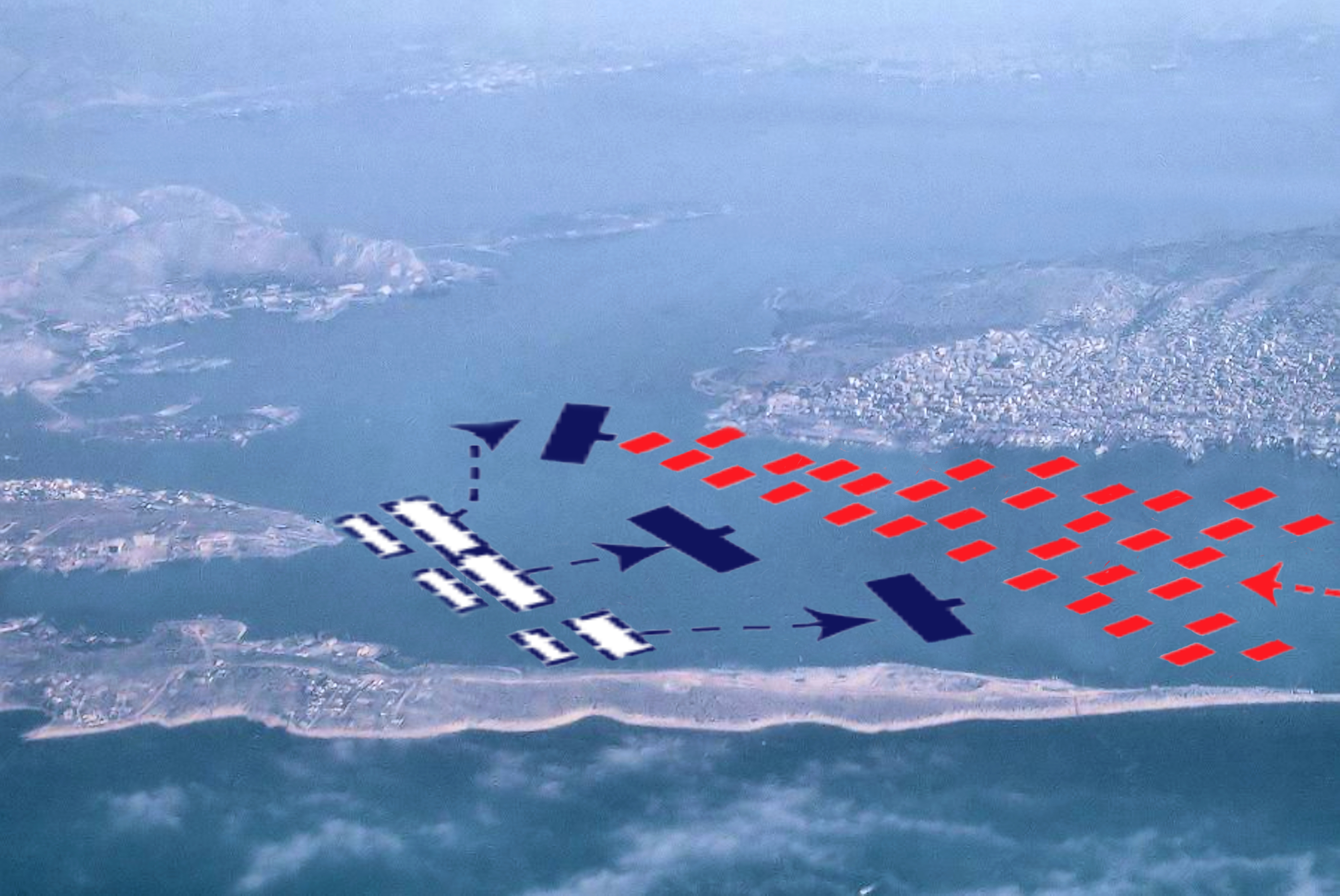
Battle order. The Achaemenid fleet (in red) entered from the east (right) and confronted the Greek fleet (in blue) within the confines of the strait.

The Allied fleet now rowed from Artemisium to Salamis to assist with the final evacuation of Athens. En route Themistocles left inscriptions addressed to the Ionian Greek crews of the Persian fleet on all springs of water that they might stop at, asking them to defect to the Allied cause.

Men of Ionia, that what you are doing is not proper, campaigning against your fathers and wishing to enslave Greece. It would be best if you came on our side. But if this is not possible, at least during the battle stand aside and also beg the Carians to do the same with you. But if you can not do either the one or the other, if you are chained by higher force and you can not defect during the operations, when we come at hand, act purposely as cowards remembering that we are of the same blood and that the first cause of animosity with the barbarians came from you.

Following Thermopylae, the Persian army proceeded to burn and sack the Boeotian cities that had not surrendered - Plataea and Thespiae -before marching on the now evacuated city of Athens. The Allies (mostly Peloponnesian) prepared to defend the Isthmus of Corinth, demolishing the single road that led through it, and building a wall across it.

This strategy was flawed, however, unless the Allied fleet was able to prevent the Persian fleet from transporting troops across the Saronic Gulf. In a council-of-war called once the evacuation of Athens was complete, the Corinthian naval commander Adeimantus argued that the fleet should assemble off the coast of the Isthmus in order to achieve such a blockade. However, Themistocles argued in favour of an offensive strategy, aimed at decisively destroying the Persians' naval superiority. He drew on the lessons of Artemisium, pointing out that "battle in close conditions works to our advantage". He eventually won through, and the Allied navy remained off the coast of Salamis.

The timeline for Salamis is difficult to establish with any certainty. Herodotus presents the battle as though it occurred directly after the capture of Athens, but nowhere explicitly states as much. If Thermopylae/Artemisium occurred in September, then this may be the case, but it is probably more likely that the Persians spent two or three weeks capturing Athens, refitting the fleet, and resupplying. Clearly though, at some point after capturing Athens, Xerxes held a council of war with the Persian fleet; Herodotus says this occurred at Phalerum. Artemisia, queen of Halicarnassus and commander of its naval squadron in Xerxes's fleet, tried to convince him to wait for the Allies to surrender believing that battle in the straits of Salamis was an unnecessary risk. Nevertheless, Xerxes and his chief advisor Mardonius pressed for an attack.

It is difficult to explain exactly what eventually brought about the battle, assuming that neither side simply attacked without forethought. Clearly though, at some point just before the battle, new information began to reach Xerxes of rifts in the allied command; the Peloponnesians wished to evacuate from Salamis while they still could. This alleged rift amongst the Allies may have simply been a ruse, in order to lure the Persians to battle. Alternatively, this change in attitude amongst the Allies (who had waited patiently off the coast of Salamis for at least a week while Athens was captured) may have been in response to Persian offensive maneuvers. Possibly, a Persian army had been sent to march against the Isthmus in order to test the nerve of the fleet.

Either way, when Xerxes received this news, he ordered his fleet to go out on patrol off the coast of Salamis, blocking the southern exit. Then, at dusk, he ordered them to withdraw, possibly in order to tempt the Allies into a hasty evacuation. That evening Themistocles attempted what appears to have been a spectacularly successful use of disinformation. He sent a servant, Sicinnus, to Xerxes, with a message proclaiming that Themistocles was "on the king's side and prefers that your affairs prevail, not the Hellenes". Themistocles claimed that the Allied command was in-fighting, that the Peloponnesians were planning to evacuate that very night, and that to gain victory all the Persians needed to do was to block the straits. In performing this subterfuge, Themistocles seems to have been trying to bring about exactly the opposite; to lure the Persian fleet into the Straits. This was exactly the kind of news that Xerxes wanted to hear; that the Athenians might be willing to submit to him, and that he would be able to destroy the rest of the Allied fleet. Xerxes evidently took the bait, and the Persian fleet was sent out that evening to effect this block. Xerxes ordered a throne to be set up on the slopes of Mount Aigaleo (overlooking the straits), in order to watch the battle from a clear vantage point, and so as to record the names of commanders who performed particularly well.

According to Herodotus, the Allies spent the evening heatedly debating their course of action. The Peloponnesians were in favour of evacuating, and at this point, Themistocles attempted his ruse with Xerxes. It was only when Aristides, the exiled Athenian general arrived that night, followed by some deserters from the Persians, with news of the deployment of the Persian fleet, that the Peloponnesians accepted that they could not escape, and so would fight.

However, the Peloponnesians may have been party to Themistocles's stratagem, so serenely did they accept that they would now have to fight at Salamis. The Allied navy was thus able to prepare properly for battle the forthcoming day, whilst the Persians spent the night fruitlessly at sea, searching for the alleged Greek evacuation. The next morning, the Persians rowed into the straits to attack the Greek fleet; it is not clear when, why or how this decision was made, but it is clear that they did take the battle to the Allies.

== Opposing forces ==
=== Greek fleet ===
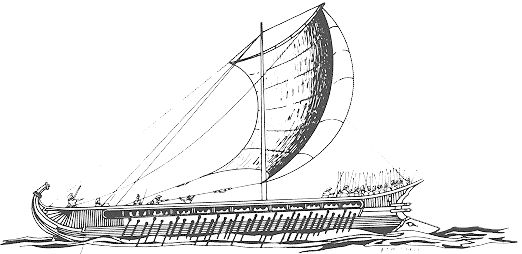
Greek trireme.

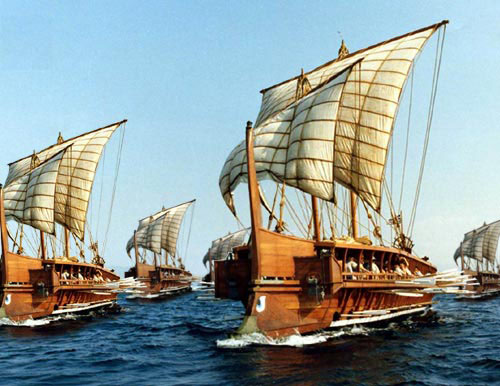
Fleet of triremes based on the full-sized replica Olympias

Herodotus reports that there were 378 triremes in the Allied fleet, and then breaks the numbers down by city state (as indicated in the table). However, his numbers for the individual contingents only add up to 371. He does not explicitly say that all 378 fought at Salamis ("All of these came to the war providing triremes...The total number of ships...was three hundred and seventy-eight"), and he also says that the Aeginetans "had other manned ships, but they guarded their own land with these and fought at Salamis with the thirty most seaworthy". Thus it has been supposed that the difference between the numbers is accounted for by a garrison of 12 ships left at Aegina. According to Herodotus, two more ships defected from the Persians to the Greeks, one before Artemisium and one before Salamis, so the total complement at Salamis would have been 373 (or 380).

According to the Athenian playwright Aeschylus, who actually fought at Salamis, the Greek fleet numbered 310 triremes (the difference being the number of Athenian ships). Ctesias claims that the Athenian fleet numbered only 110 triremes, which ties in with Aeschylus's numbers. According to Hyperides, the Greek fleet numbered only 220. The fleet was effectively under the command of Themistocles, but nominally led by the Spartan nobleman Eurybiades, as had been agreed at the congress in 481 BC. Although Themistocles had tried to claim leadership of the fleet, the other city states with navies objected, and so Sparta (which had no naval tradition) was given command of the fleet as a compromise.

City		City		City	Number of ships
Athens	180	Corinth	40	Aegina	30
Chalcis	20	Megara	20	Sparta	16
Sicyon	15	Epidaurus	10	Eretria	7
Ambracia	7	Troezen	5	Naxos	4
Leucas	3	Hermione	3	Styra	2
Cythnus	1 (1)	Ceos	2	Melos	(2)
Siphnus	(1)	Serifos	(1)	Croton	1
Total	371 or 378 (5)				

^{Plain numbers represent triremes; those indicated in parentheses are penteconters (fifty-oared galleys)}

=== Achemenid fleet ===
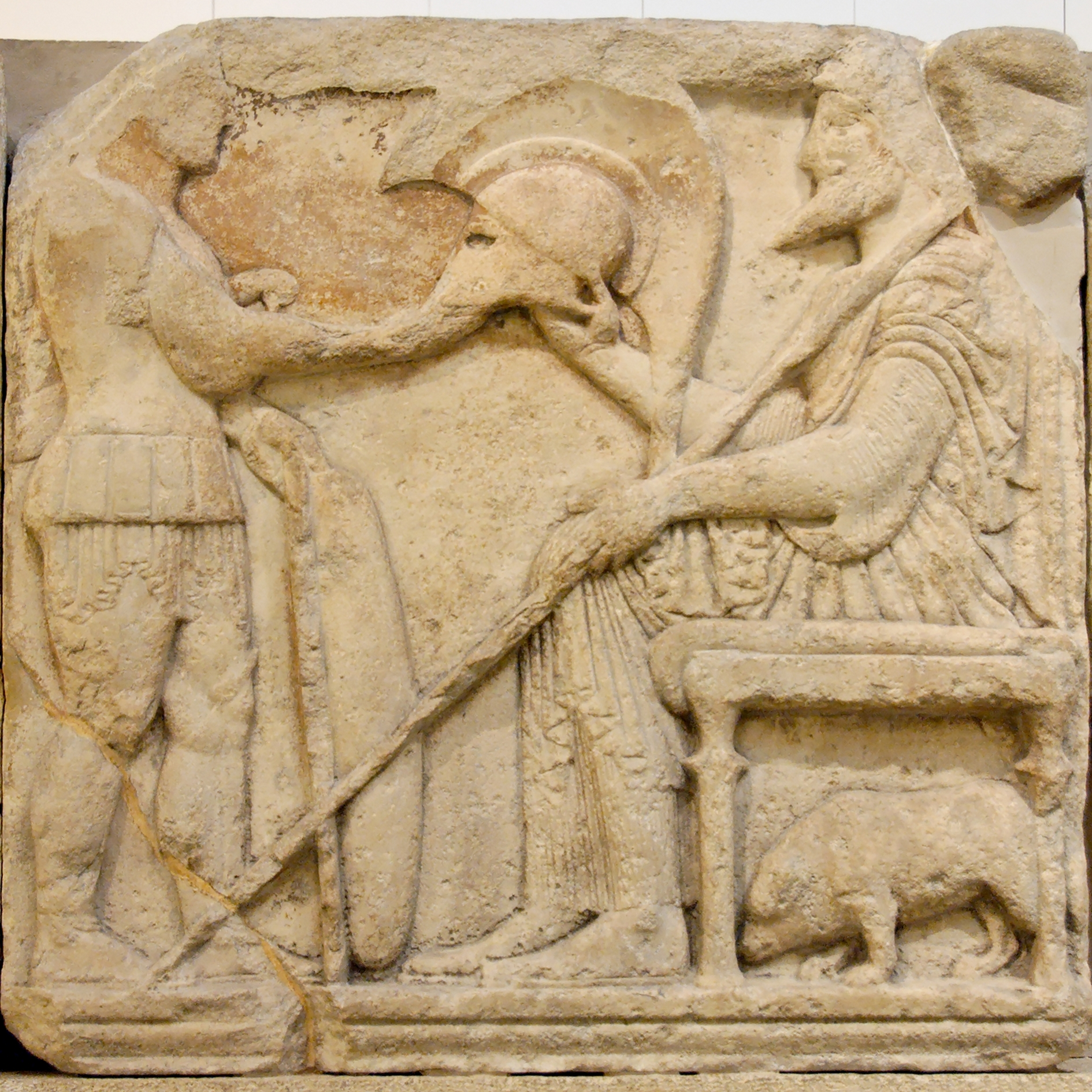
The Lycian dynast Kybernis (520-480 BC) led 50 Lycian ships in the Achaemenid fleet.

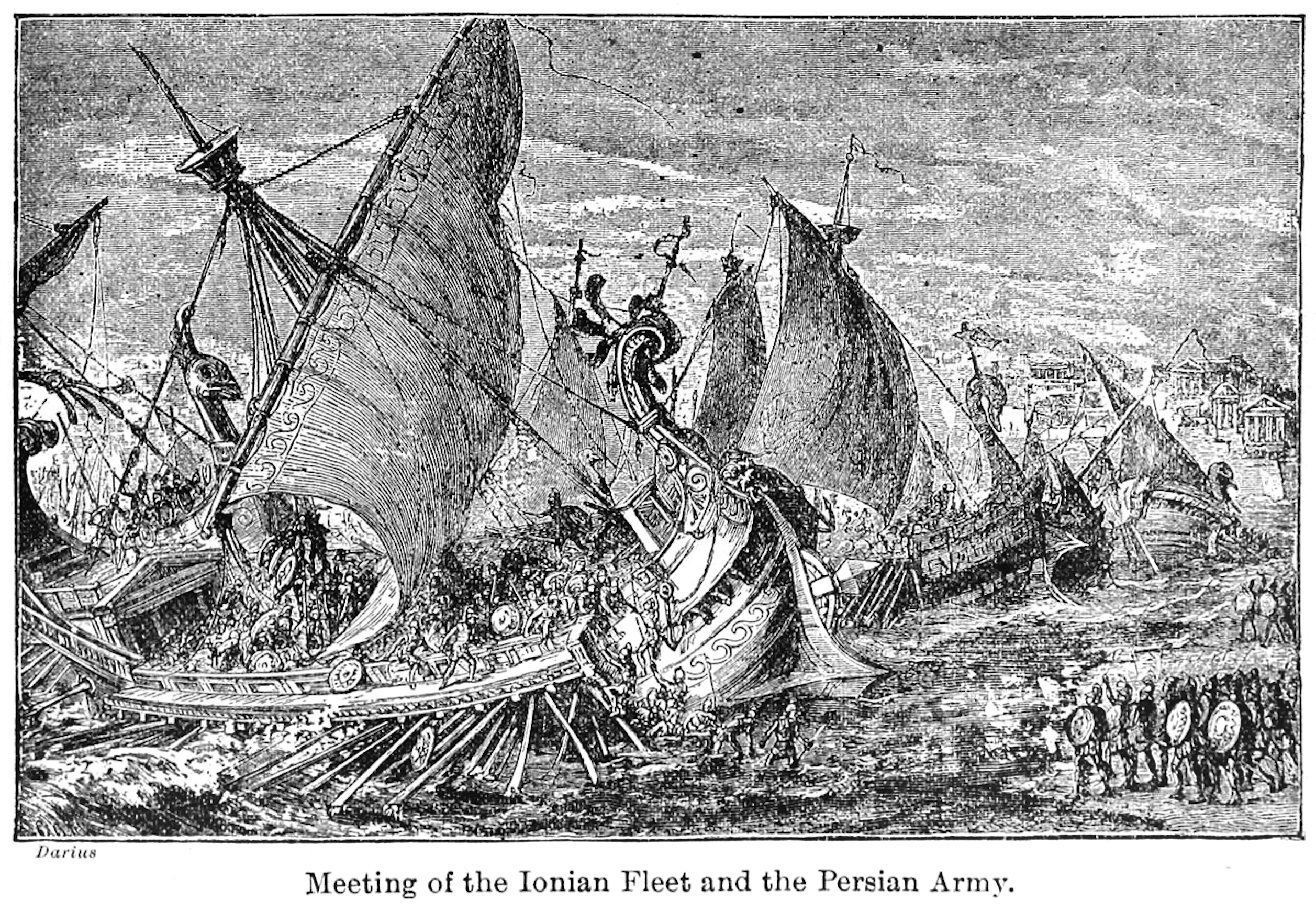
The Ionian fleet, here seen joining with Persian forces at the Bosphorus in preparation of the European Scythian campaign of Darius I in 513 BC, was part of the Achaemenid fleet at Salamis. 19th century illustration.

According to Herodotus, the Persian fleet initially numbered 1,207 triremes. However, by his reckoning they lost approximately a third of these ships in a storm off the coast of Magnesia, 200 more in a storm off the coast of Euboea, and at least 50 ships to Allied action at the Battle of Artemisium. Herodotus claims that these losses were replaced in full, but only mentions 120 ships from the Greeks of Thrace and nearby islands as reinforcements. Aeschylus, who fought at Salamis, also claims that he faced 1,207 warships there, of which 207 were "fast ships". Diodorus and Lysias independently claim there were 1,200 ships in the Persian fleet assembled at Doriskos in the spring of 480 BC. The number of 1,207 (for the outset only) is also given by Ephorus, while his teacher Isocrates claims there were 1,300 at Doriskos and 1,200 at Salamis. Ctesias gives another number, 1,000 ships, while Plato, speaking in general terms refers to 1,000 ships and more.

Herodotus gives a precise list of the ships of the various nations that composed the Achaemenid fleet:

Nation		Nation		Nation	Number of ships
Phoenicia	300	Egypt	200	Cyprus	150
Cilicia	100	Ionia	100	Hellespontine Phrygia	100
Caria	70	Aeolia	60	Lycia	50
Pamphylia	30	Doria	30	Cyclades	17
Total	1207				

The number 1,207 appears very early in the historical record (472 BC), and the Greeks appear to have genuinely believed they faced that many ships. Because of the consistency in the ancient sources, some modern historians are inclined to accept 1,207 as the size of the initial Persian fleet; others reject this number, with 1,207 being seen as more of a reference to the combined Greek fleet in the Iliad, and generally claim that the Persians could have launched no more than around 600 warships into the Aegean. However, very few appear to accept that there were this many ships at Salamis: most favour a number in the range 600–800. This is also the range given by adding the approximate number of Persian ships after Artemisium (~550) to the reinforcements (120) quantified by Herodotus.

== Strategic and tactical considerations ==
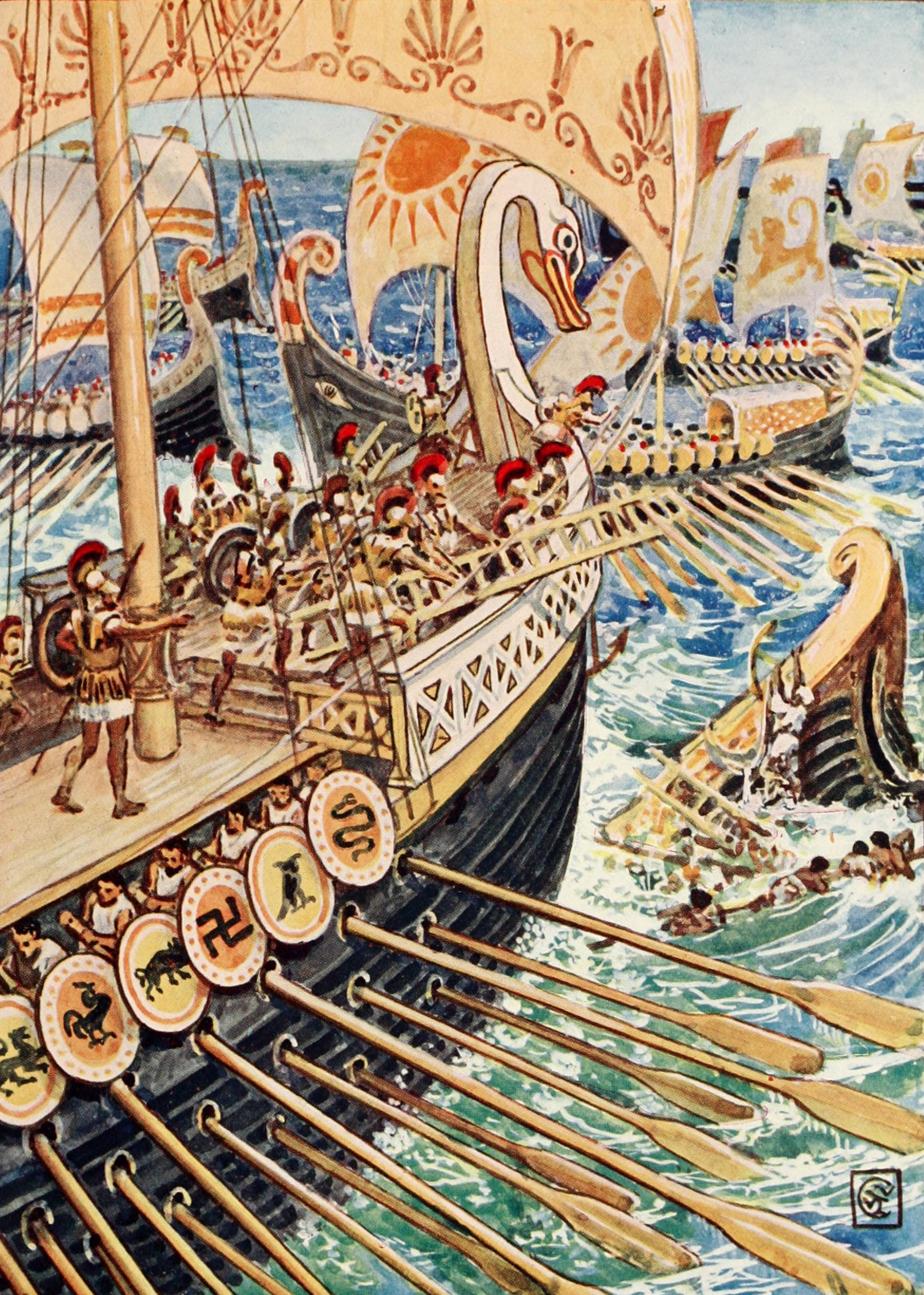
The battle of Salamis, 19th century illustration.

The overall Persian strategy for the invasion of 480 BC was to overwhelm the Greeks with a massive invasion force, and complete the conquest of Greece in a single campaigning season. In contrast, the Greeks sought to make the best use of their numbers by defending restricted locations and to keep the Persians in the field for as long as possible. Xerxes had obviously not anticipated such resistance, or he would have arrived earlier in the campaigning season (and not waited 4 days at Thermopylae for the Greeks to disperse). Time was now of the essence for the Persians – the huge invasion force could not be reasonably supported indefinitely, nor probably did Xerxes wish to be at the fringe of his empire for so long. Thermopylae had shown that a frontal assault against a well defended Greek position was useless; with the Allies now dug in across the narrow Isthmus, there was little chance of conquering the rest of Greece by land. However, as equally demonstrated by Thermopylae, if the Greeks could be outflanked, their smaller numbers of troops could be destroyed. Such an outflanking of the Isthmus required the use of the Persian navy, and thus the destruction of the Allied navy. Therefore, if Xerxes could destroy the Allied navy, he would be in a strong position to force a Greek surrender; this seemed the only hope of concluding the campaign in that season. In contrast, by avoiding destruction, or as Themistocles hoped, by crippling the Persian fleet, the Greeks could effectively thwart the invasion.

However, it was strategically not necessary for the Persians to actually fight this battle at Salamis. According to Herodotus, Queen Artemisia of Caria pointed this out to Xerxes in the run-up to Salamis. Artemisia suggested that fighting at sea was an unnecessary risk, recommending instead:

If you do not hurry to fight at sea, but keep your ships here and stay near land, or even advance into the Peloponnese, then, my lord, you will easily accomplish what you had in mind on coming here. The Hellenes are not able to hold out against you for a long time, but you will scatter them, and they will each flee to their own cities.

The Persian fleet was still large enough to both bottle up the Allied navy in the straits of Salamis, and send ships to land troops in the Peloponnese. However, in the final reckoning, both sides were prepared to stake everything on a naval battle, in the hope of decisively altering the course of the war.

The Persians were at a tactical advantage, outnumbering the Allies, and also having "better sailing" ships. The "better sailing" that Herodotus mentions was probably due to the superior seamanship of the crews; most of the Athenian ships (and therefore the majority of the fleet) were newly built as according to Themistocles' request to the Athenians to build a fleet of 200 triremes in 483 BC, and had inexperienced crews. Despite the inexperienced crew on the part of the Athenians, these newly constructed triremes would ultimately prove crucial in the forthcoming conflict with Persia. The most common naval tactics in the Mediterranean area at the time were ramming (triremes being equipped with a ram at the bows), or boarding by ship-borne marines (which essentially turned a sea battle into a land one). The Persians and Asiatic Greeks had by this time begun to use a manoeuvre known as diekplous. It is not entirely clear what this was, but it probably involved rowing into gaps between enemy ships and then ramming them in the side. This manoeuvre would have required skilled crews, and therefore the Persians would have been more likely to employ it; the Allies however, developed tactics specifically to counter this.

There has been much debate as to the nature of the Allied fleet compared to the Persian fleet. Much of this centres on the suggestion, from Herodotus, that the Allied ships were heavier, and by implication less manoeuvrable. The source of this heaviness is uncertain; possibly the Allied ships were bulkier in construction, or that the ships were waterlogged since they had not been dried out in the winter (though there is no real evidence for either suggestion). Another suggestion is that the heaviness was caused by the weight of fully armored hoplite marines (20 fully armored hoplites would have weighed 2 tons). This 'heaviness', whatever its cause, would further reduce the likelihood of them employing the diekplous. It is therefore probable that the Allies had extra marines on board if their ships were less manoeuvrable, since boarding would then be the main tactic available to them (at the cost of making the ships even heavier). Indeed, Herodotus refers to the Greeks capturing ships at Artemisium, rather than sinking them. It has been suggested that the weight of the Allied ships may also have made them more stable in the winds off the coast of Salamis, and made them less liable to sustain damage when rammed.

The Persians preferred a battle in the open sea, where they could better utilize their own superior seamanship and numbers. For the Greeks, the only realistic hope of a victory was to draw the Persians into a constricted area, where Persian numbers would count for little. The battle at Artemisium had seen attempts to negate the Persian advantage in numbers, but ultimately the Allies may have realised that they needed an even more constricted channel in order to defeat the Persians. Therefore, by rowing into the Straits of Salamis to attack the Greeks, the Persians were playing into the Allies' hands. It seems probable that the Persians would not have attempted this unless they had been confident of the collapse of the Allied navy, and thus Themistocles's subterfuge appears to have played a key role in tipping the balance in the favor of the Greeks. Salamis was, for the Persians, an unnecessary battle and a strategic mistake.

== Battle ==
The battle of Salamis is not well described by ancient sources, and it is unlikely that anyone (other than perhaps Xerxes) involved in the battle had a clear idea what was happening across the width of the straits. What follows is more of a discussion than a definitive account.

=== Dispositions ===
In the Allied fleet, the Athenians were on the left, and on the right were probably the Spartans (although Diodorus says it was the Megareans and Aeginetians); the other contingents were in the center. The Allied fleet probably formed into two ranks, since the straits would have been too narrow for a single line of ships. Herodotus has the Allied fleet in a line running north–south, probably with the northern flank off the coast of modern-day Saint George's Islet (Ayios Georgis), and the southern flank off the coast of Cape Vavari (part of Salamis). Diodorus suggests the Allied fleet was aligned east–west, spanning the straits between Salamis and Mount Aigaleo; however, it is unlikely that the Allies would have rested one of their flanks against Persian occupied territory.

It seems relatively certain that the Persian fleet was sent out to block the exit from the Straits the evening before the battle. Herodotus clearly believed that the Persian fleet actually entered the Straits at nightfall, planning to catch the Allies as they fled. However, modern historians have greatly debated this point, with some pointing out the difficulties of maneuvering in this confined space by night, and others accepting Herodotus's version. There are thus two possibilities; that during the night the Persians simply blocked the exit to the Straits, and then entered the straits in daylight; or that they entered the straits and positioned themselves for battle during the night. Regardless of when they attempted it, it seems likely that the Persians pivoted their fleet off the tip of Cape Vavari, so that from an initial east–west alignment (blocking the exit), they came round to a north–south alignment (see diagram). The Persian fleet seems to have been formed into three ranks of ships (according to Aeschylus); with the powerful Phoenician fleet on the right flank next to Mount Aigaleo, the Ionian contingent on the left flank and the other contingents in the centre.

Diodorus says that the Egyptian fleet was sent to circumnavigate Salamis, and block the northern exit from the Straits. If Xerxes wanted to trap the Allies completely, this maneuver would have made sense (especially if he was not expecting the Allies to fight). However, Herodotus does not mention this (and possibly alludes to the Egyptian presence in the main battle), leading some modern historians to dismiss it; though again, others accept it as a possibility. Xerxes had also positioned around 400 troops on the island known as Psyttaleia, in the middle of the exit from the straits, in order to kill or capture any Greeks who ended up there (as a result of shipwreck or grounding).

=== Opening phase ===
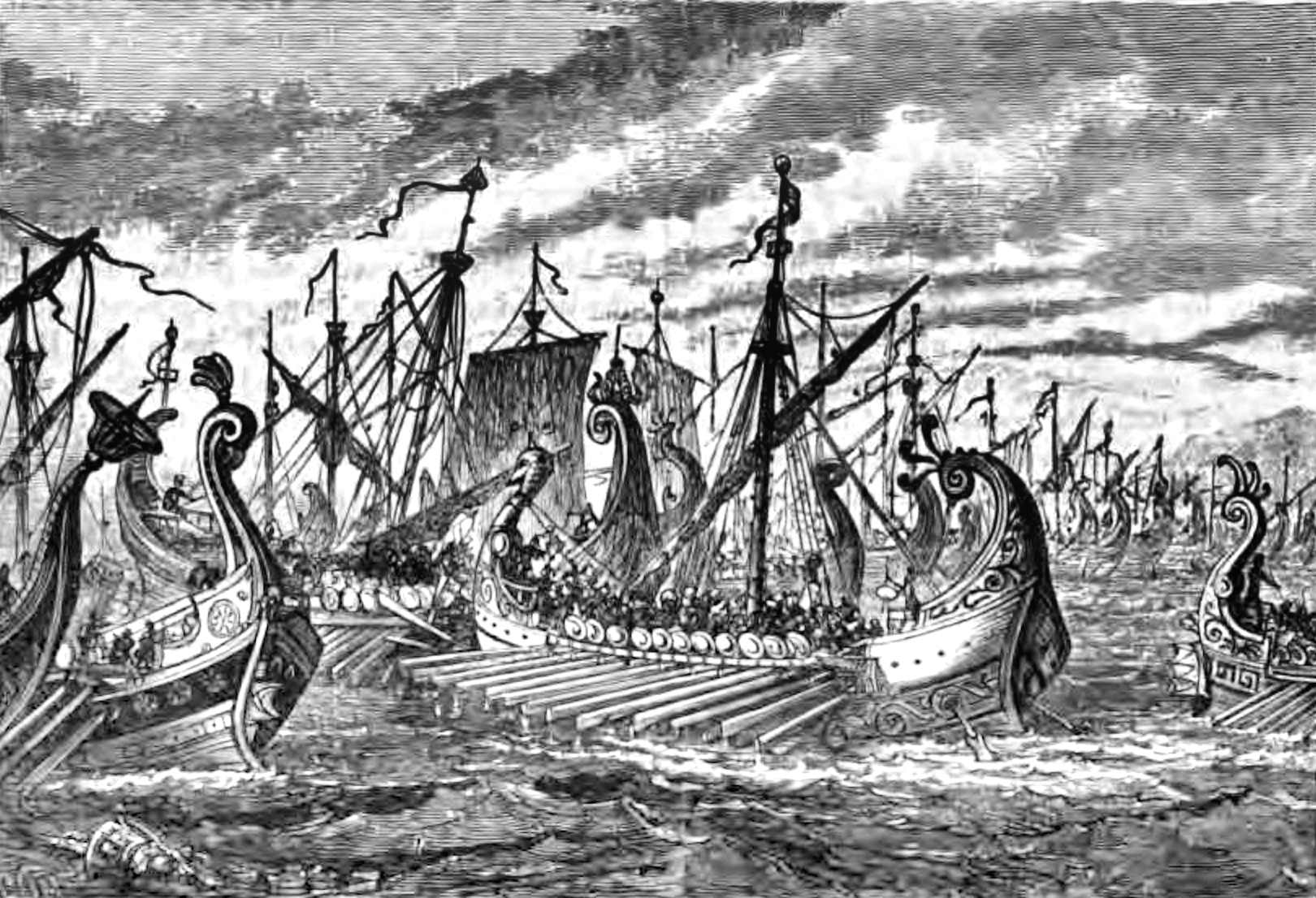
Greek triremes at Salamis.

Regardless of what time they entered the straits, the Persians did not move to attack the Allies until daylight. Since they were not planning to flee after all, the Allies would have been able to spend the night preparing for battle, and after a speech by Themistocles, the marines boarded and the ships made ready to sail. According to Herodotus, this was dawn, and as the Allies "were putting out to sea the barbarians immediately attacked them". If the Persians only entered the straits at dawn, then the Allies would have had the time to take up their station in a more orderly fashion.

Aeschylus claims that as the Persians approached (possibly implying that they were not already in the Straits at dawn), they heard the Greeks singing their battle hymn (paean) before they saw the Allied fleet:

ὦ παῖδες Ἑλλήνων ἴτε
ἐλευθεροῦτε πατρίδ᾽, ἐλευθεροῦτε δὲ
παῖδας, γυναῖκας, θεῶν τέ πατρῴων ἕδη,
θήκας τε προγόνων: νῦν ὑπὲρ πάντων ἀγών.

O sons of the Greeks, go,
Liberate your country, liberate
Your children, your women, the seats of your fathers' gods,
And the tombs of your forebears: now is the struggle for all things.

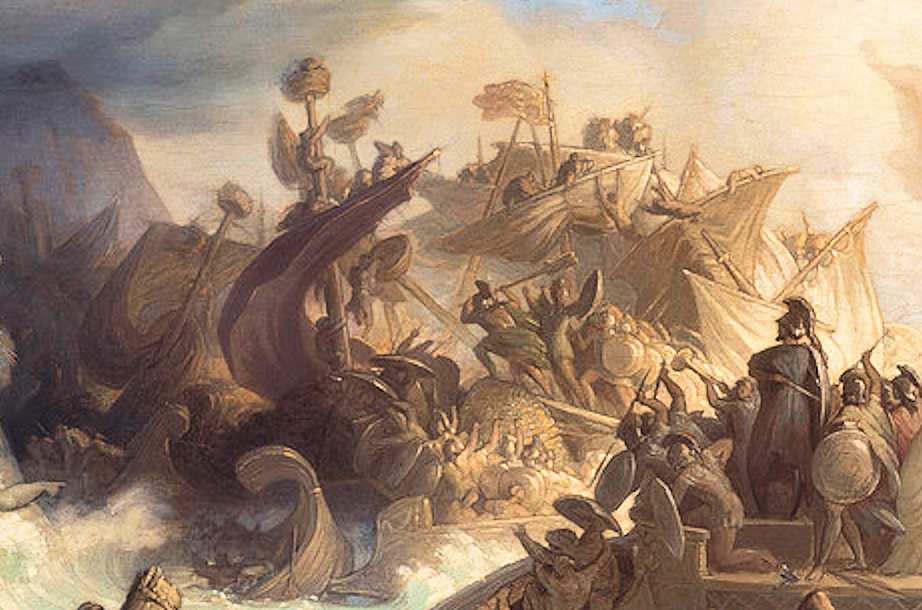
Battle of Salamis, by Wilhelm von Kaulbach (detail).

Herodotus recounts that, according to the Athenians, as the battle began the Corinthians hoisted their sails and began sailing away from the battle, northwards up the straits. However, he also says that all the other Greeks denied this story. If this did in fact occur, one possible interpretation is that these ships had been a decoy sent to reconnoitre the northern exit from the straits, in case the arrival of the encircling Egyptian detachment was imminent (if indeed this also occurred). Another possibility (not exclusive of the former) is that the departure of the Corinthians triggered the final approach of the Persians, suggesting as it did that the Allied fleet was disintegrating. At any rate, if they indeed ever left, the Corinthians soon returned to the battle.

Approaching the Allied fleet in the crowded Straits, the Persians appear to have become disorganised and cramped in the narrow waters. Moreover, it would have become apparent that, far from disintegrating, the Greek fleet was lined up, ready to attack them. However, rather than attacking immediately, the Allies initially appeared to back their ships away as if in fear. According to Plutarch, this was to gain better position, and also in order to gain time until the early morning wind. Herodotus recounts the legend that as the fleet had backed away, they had seen an apparition of a woman, asking them "Madmen, how far will ye yet back your ships?" However, he more plausibly suggests that whilst the Allies were backing water, a single ship shot forward to ram the nearest Persian vessel. The Athenians would claim that this was the ship of the Athenian Ameinias of Pallene; the Aeginetans would claim it as one of their ships. The whole Greek line then followed suit and made straight for the disordered Persian battle line.

=== Main battle ===
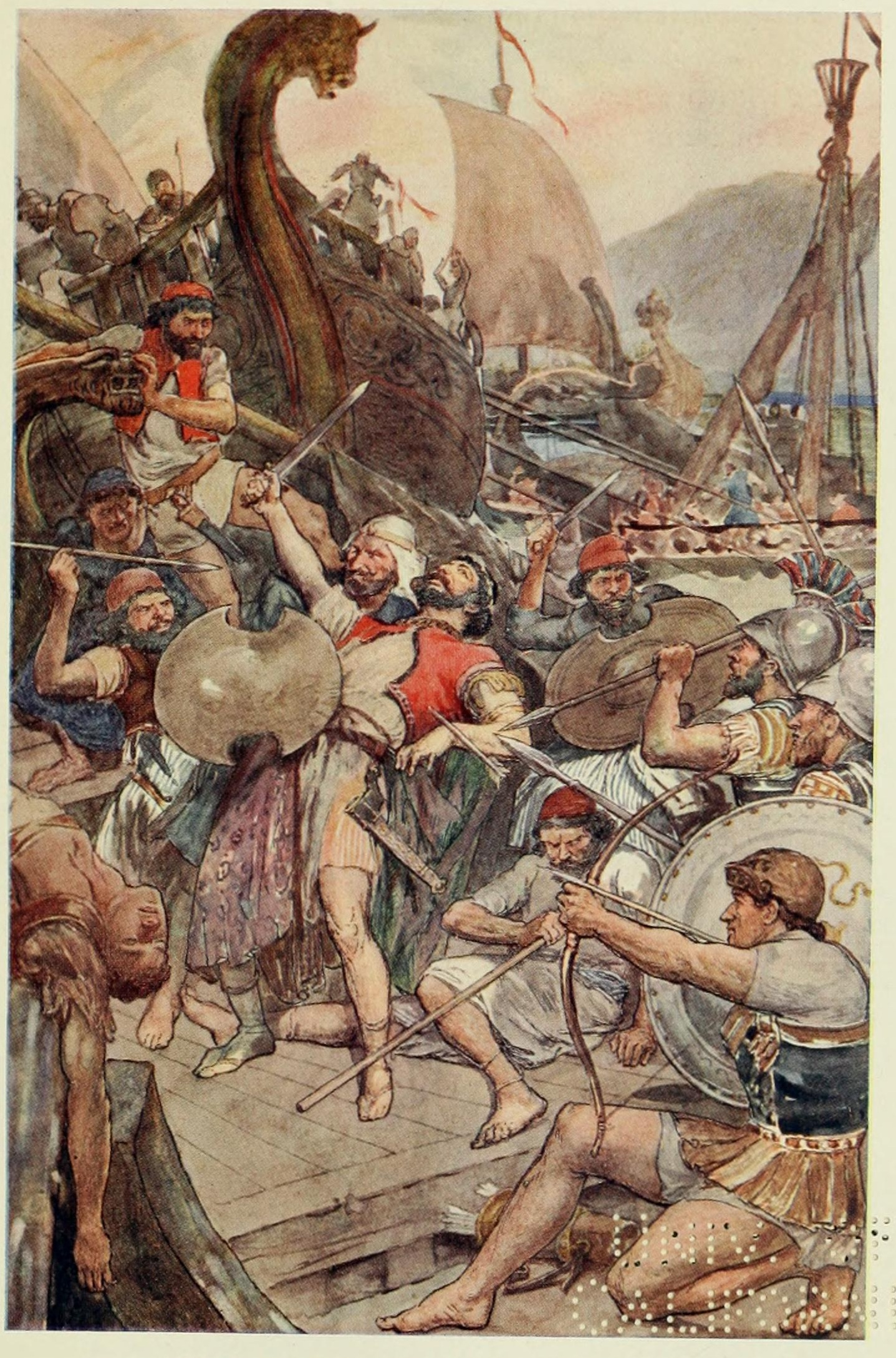
Death of the Persian admiral Ariabignes (a brother of Xerxes) early in the battle; illustration from Plutarch's Lives for Boys and Girls c. 1910

The details of the rest of the battle are generally sketchy, and no one involved would have had a view of the entire battlefield. Triremes were generally armed with a large ram at the front, with which it was possible to sink an enemy ship, or at least disable it by shearing off the banks of oars on one side. If the initial ramming was not successful, marines boarded the enemy ship and something similar to a land battle ensued. Both sides had marines on their ships for this eventuality; the Greeks with fully armed hoplites; the Persians probably with more lightly armed infantry.

Across the battlefield, as the first line of Persian ships was pushed back by the Greeks, they became fouled in the advancing second and third lines of their own ships. On the Greek left, the Persian admiral Ariabignes (a brother of Xerxes) was killed early in the battle; left disorganised and leaderless, the Phoenician squadrons appear to have been pushed back against the coast, many vessels running aground. In the centre, a wedge of Greek ships pushed through the Persians' lines, splitting the fleet in two.

According to Plutarch, Ariabignes was killed by Ameinias of Decelea and Socles of Paeania. When Ariabignes attempted to board their ship, they hit him with their spears, and thrust him into the sea. Plutarch also mentions that it was Artemisia who recognized Ariabignes' body floating among the shipwrecks and brought it back to Xerxes.

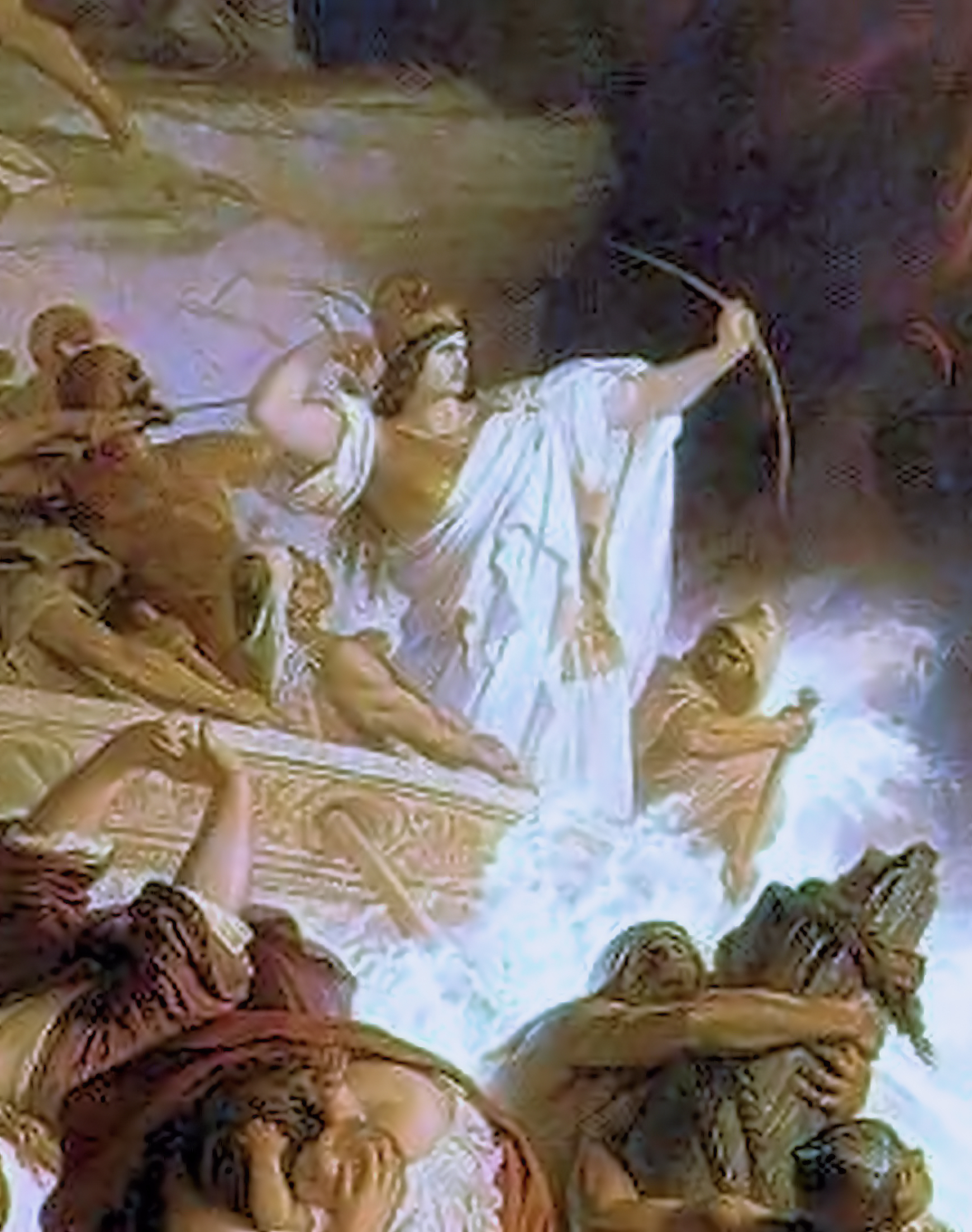
Artemisia, Queen of Halicarnassus, and commander of the Carian contingent of the Achaemenid fleet, at the Battle of Salamis, shooting arrows at the Greeks. Wilhelm von Kaulbach (detail).

Herodotus recounts that Artemisia, the Queen of Halicarnassus, and commander of the Carian contingent, found herself pursued by the ship of Ameinias of Pallene. In her desire to escape, she attacked and rammed another Persian vessel, thereby convincing the Athenian captain that the ship was an ally; Ameinias accordingly abandoned the chase. However, Xerxes, looking on, thought that she had successfully attacked an Allied ship, and seeing the poor performance of his other captains commented that "My men have become women, and my women men". The friendly ship she sank was a Calyndian ship and the king of the Calyndians, Damasithymos (Greek: Δαμασίθυμος) was on it. None of the crew of the Calyndian ship survived.

The Persian fleet began to retreat towards Phalerum, but according to Herodotus, the Aeginetans ambushed them as they tried to leave the Straits. The remaining Persian ships limped back to the harbour of Phalerum and the shelter of the Persian army. The Athenian general Aristides then took a detachment of men across to Psyttaleia to slaughter the garrison that Xerxes had left there.

The exact Persian casualties are not mentioned by Herodotus. However, he writes that the next year, the Persian fleet numbered 300 triremes. The number of losses then depends on the number of ships the Persian had to begin with; something in the range of 200–300 seems likely, based on the above estimates for the size of the Persian fleet. According to Herodotus, the Persians suffered many more casualties than the Greeks because most Persians did not know how to swim.

Xerxes, sitting on Mount Aigaleo on his throne, witnessed the carnage. Some ship-wrecked Phoenician captains tried to blame the Ionians for cowardice before the end of the battle. Xerxes, in a foul mood, and having just witnessed an Ionian ship capture an Aeginetan ship, had the Phoenicians beheaded for slandering "more noble men". According to Diodorus, Xerxes "put to death those Phoenicians who were chiefly responsible for beginning the flight, and threatened to visit upon the rest the punishment they deserved", causing the Phoenicians to sail to Asia when night fell.

== Aftermath ==
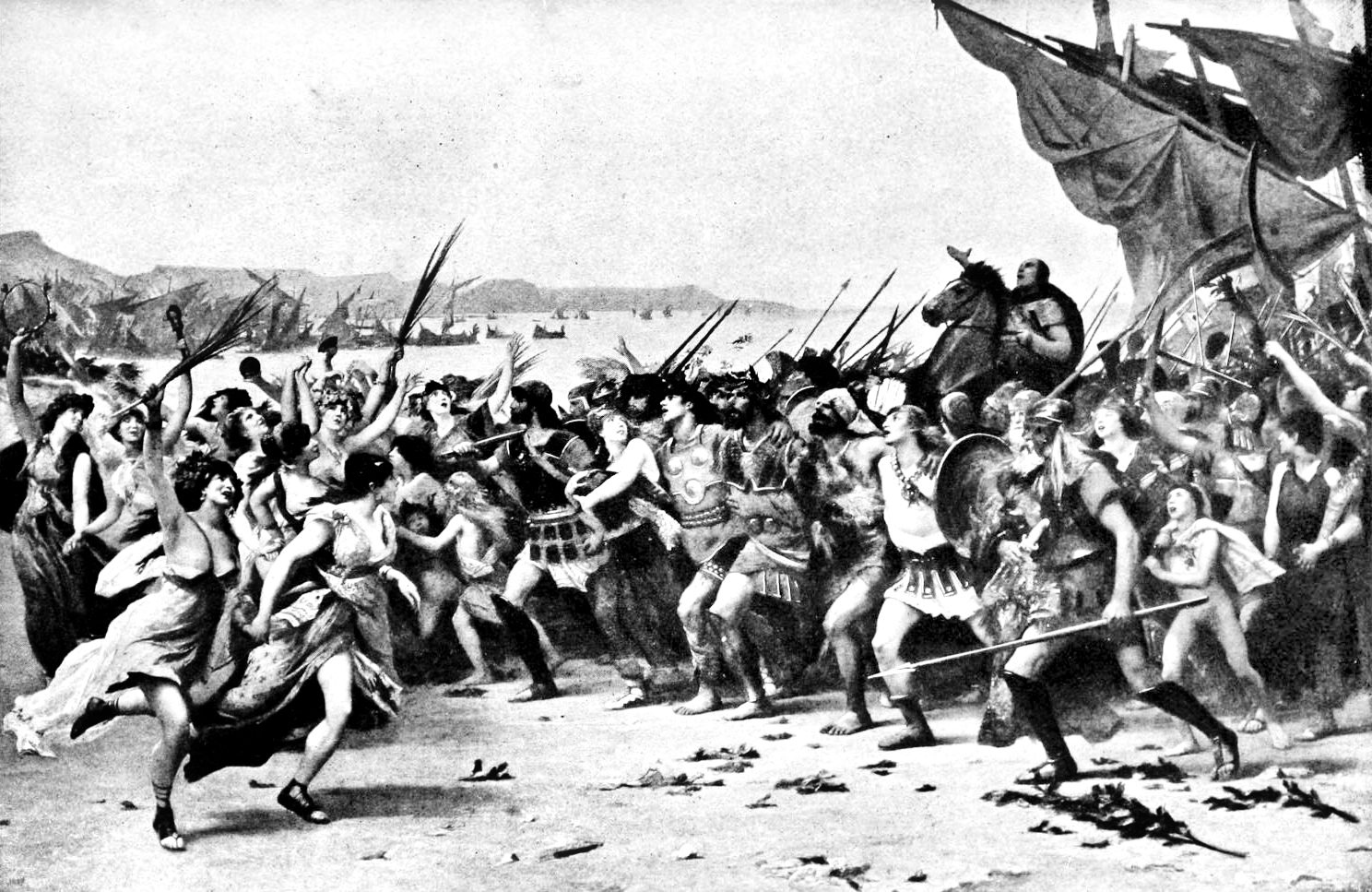
The triumph of Themistocles after Salamis. 19th century illustration.

In the immediate aftermath of Salamis, Xerxes attempted to build a pontoon bridge or causeway across the straits, in order to use his army to attack the Athenians; however, with the Greek fleet now confidently patrolling the straits, this proved futile. Herodotus tells us that Xerxes held a council of war, at which the Persian general Mardonius tried to make light of the defeat:

Sire, be not grieved nor greatly distressed because of what has befallen us. It is not on things of wood that the issue hangs for us, but on men and horses...If then you so desire, let us straightway attack the Peloponnese, or if it pleases you to wait, that also we can do...It is best then that you should do as I have said, but if you have resolved to lead your army away, even then I have another plan. Do not, O king, make the Persians the laughing-stock of the Greeks, for if you have suffered harm, it is by no fault of the Persians. Nor can you say that we have anywhere done less than brave men should, and if Phoenicians and Egyptians and Cyprians and Cilicians have so done, it is not the Persians who have any part in this disaster. Therefore, since the Persians are in no way to blame, be guided by me; if you are resolved not to remain, march homewards with the greater part of your army. It is for me, however, to enslave and deliver Hellas to you with three hundred thousand of your host whom I will choose.

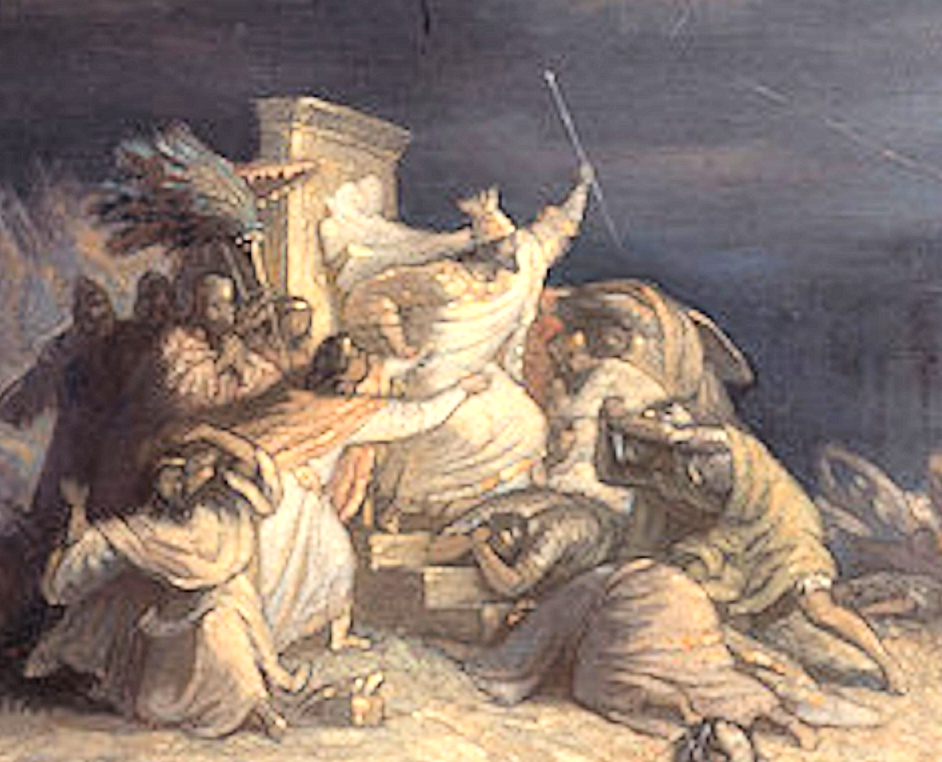
The wrath of Xerxes looking at the Battle of Salamis from his promontory, by Wilhelm von Kaulbach (detail).

Fearing that the Greeks might attack the bridges across the Hellespont and trap his army in Europe, Xerxes resolved to do this, taking the greater part of the army with him. Mardonius handpicked the troops who were to remain with him in Greece, taking the elite infantry units and cavalry, to complete the conquest of Greece. All of the Persian forces abandoned Attica, however, with Mardonius overwintering in Boeotia and Thessaly; the Athenians were thus able to return to their burnt city for the winter.

The following year, 479 BC, Mardonius recaptured Athens and led the second Achaemenid destruction of Athens (the Allied army still preferring to guard the Isthmus). However, the Allies, under Spartan leadership, eventually agreed to try to force Mardonius to battle, and marched on Attica. Mardonius retreated to Boeotia to lure the Greeks into open terrain and the two sides eventually met near the city of Plataea (which had been razed the previous year). There, at the Battle of Plataea, the Greek army emerged victorious, destroying much of the Persian army and ending the invasion of Greece; whilst at the near-simultaneous Battle of Mycale the Allied fleet destroyed much of the remaining Persian fleet.

== Significance ==
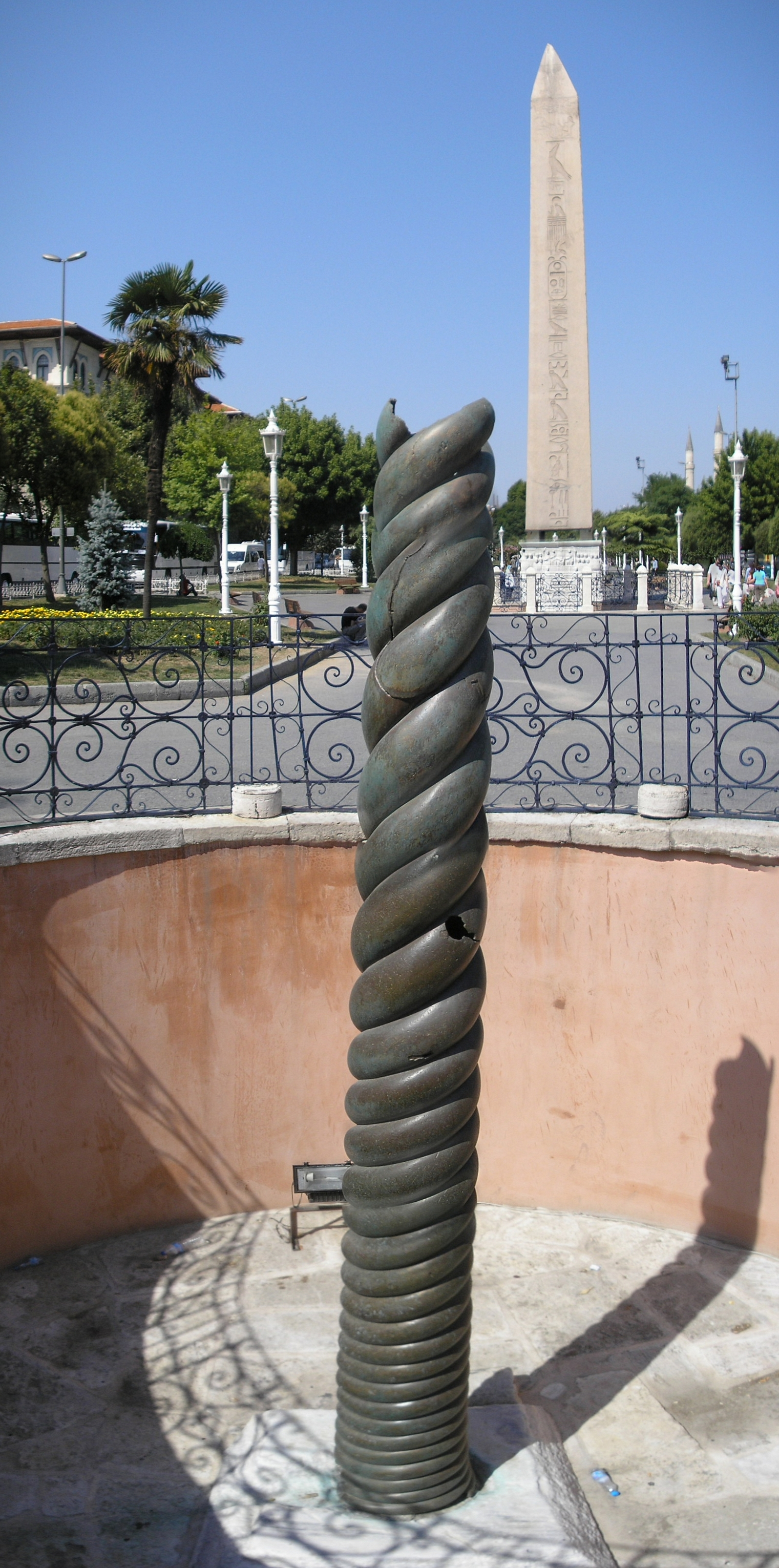
Serpent Column, a monument to their alliance, dedicated by the victorious Allies in the aftermath of Plataea; now at the Hippodrome of Constantinople

The Battle of Salamis marked the turning point in the Greco-Persian wars. After Salamis, the Peloponnese, and by extension Greece as an entity, was safe from conquest; and the Persians suffered a major blow to their prestige and morale (as well as severe material losses). At the following battles of Plataea and Mycale, the threat of conquest was removed, and the Allies were able to go on the counter-offensive. The Greek victory allowed Macedon to revolt against Persian rule; and over the next 30 years, Thrace, the Aegean Islands and finally Ionia would be removed from Persian control by the Allies, or by the Athenian-dominated successor, the Delian League. Salamis started a decisive swing in the balance of power toward the Greeks, which would culminate in an eventual Greek victory, severely reducing Persian power in the Aegean.

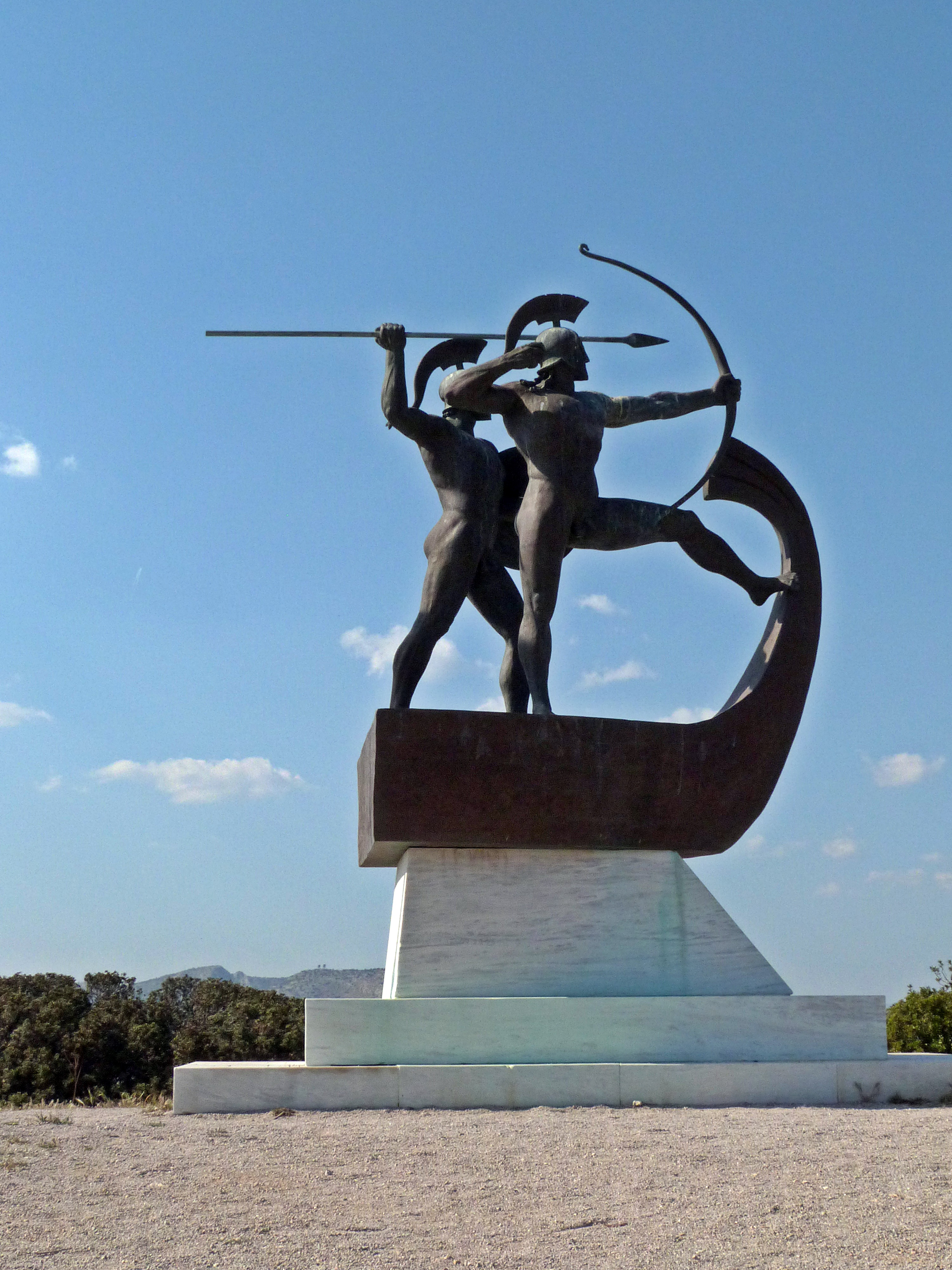
The Tomb of the Salamina Fighters monument, located in front of the sea area where the battle took place

Like the Battles of Marathon and Thermopylae, Salamis has gained something of a 'legendary' status (unlike, for instance, the more decisive Battle of Plataea), perhaps because of the desperate circumstances and the unlikely odds. A significant number of historians have stated that Salamis is one of the most significant battles in human history (though the same is often stated of Marathon). In a more extreme form of this argument, some historians argue that if the Greeks had lost at Salamis, the ensuing conquest of Greece by the Persians would have effectively stifled the growth of Western Civilization as we know it. This view is based on the premise that much of modern Western society, such as philosophy, science, personal freedom and democracy are rooted in the legacy of Ancient Greece. Thus, this school of thought argues that, given the domination of much of modern history by Western Civilization, Persian domination of Greece might have changed the whole trajectory of human history. The celebrated blossoming of hugely influential Athenian culture occurred only after the Persian wars were won.

Militarily, it is difficult to draw many lessons from Salamis, because of the uncertainty about what actually happened. Once again the Allies chose their ground well in order to negate Persian numbers, but this time (unlike Thermopylae) had to rely on the Persians launching an unnecessary attack for their position to count. Since it brought about that attack, perhaps the most important military lesson is to be found in the use of deception by Themistocles to bring about the desired response from the enemy.

According to Plutarch, the previously undistinguished Cimon "obtained great repute among the Athenians" due to his courage in battle; this reputation later enabled him to launch his political career.

== Anchorage discovery ==
On March 17, 2017, archaeologists announced that they had uncovered the partially submerged remains of the anchorage used by the Greek warships prior to the Battle of Salamis. The location of the ancient mooring site is on the island of Salamis, at the coastal Ambelaki-Kynosaurus site.

== See also ==
- Battle of Myeongnyang
