= Herakleia head =

Late Archaic Greek marble sculpture

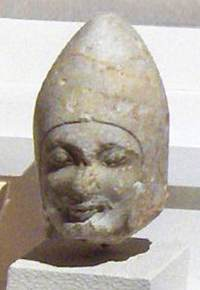
- The Herakleia head, probable depiction of an Achaemenid Empire satrap in the late 6th century BC
- Material: Marble
- Created: c. 530 BC
- Discovered: before 1989; Karadeniz Eregli, Zonguldak, Turkey
- Present location: Ankara, Ankara Province, Turkey

The Herakleia head is the portrait of a probable Achaemenid Satrap of Asia Minor of the late 6th century, found in Heraclea, in Bithynia, modern Turkey. The head is now located in the Museum of Anatolian Civilizations in Ankara.

== Overview ==
The man depicted in the sculpture was probably a Satrap under Darius I. The man is the service of the Achaemenid Empire is bearded and mustachioed, but probably a Greek from Asia Minor rather than a Persian. The statue is made of marble, and was probably made by a Greek sculptor. The sculpture has been dated to c. 530 BCE, or at least Late Archaic.

The Herakliea head is considered as an early attempt towards portraiture with a realistic likeliness. This Eastern portrait in purely East Greek Archaic style, is one of the two known forerunners of extant Greek portraits, together with the Sabouroff head. It is comparable with the Sabouroff head, from about the same period. These nearly life-like portraits allow to define a date for early portraiture which is much earlier than had been previously thought. The first truly individualistic portrait is often considered to be the 470 BCE portrait of Themistocles. In numismatics also, the first portraits of rulers appear with the coins of Themistocles as ruler of Magnesia, and continue with the nearby rulers of Lycia towards the end of the 5th century BCE.

The Herakleia head is also an important marker for the depiction of Satraps in the period. In particular, the banned Athenian general Themistocles, who became Achaemenid Satrap in Magnesia, is seen wearing a tight bonnet with an olive wreath on some of his coins (circa 465-459 BCE). This possibly reflects the headwear of Achaemenid Satraps, such as seen in the Herakleia head.

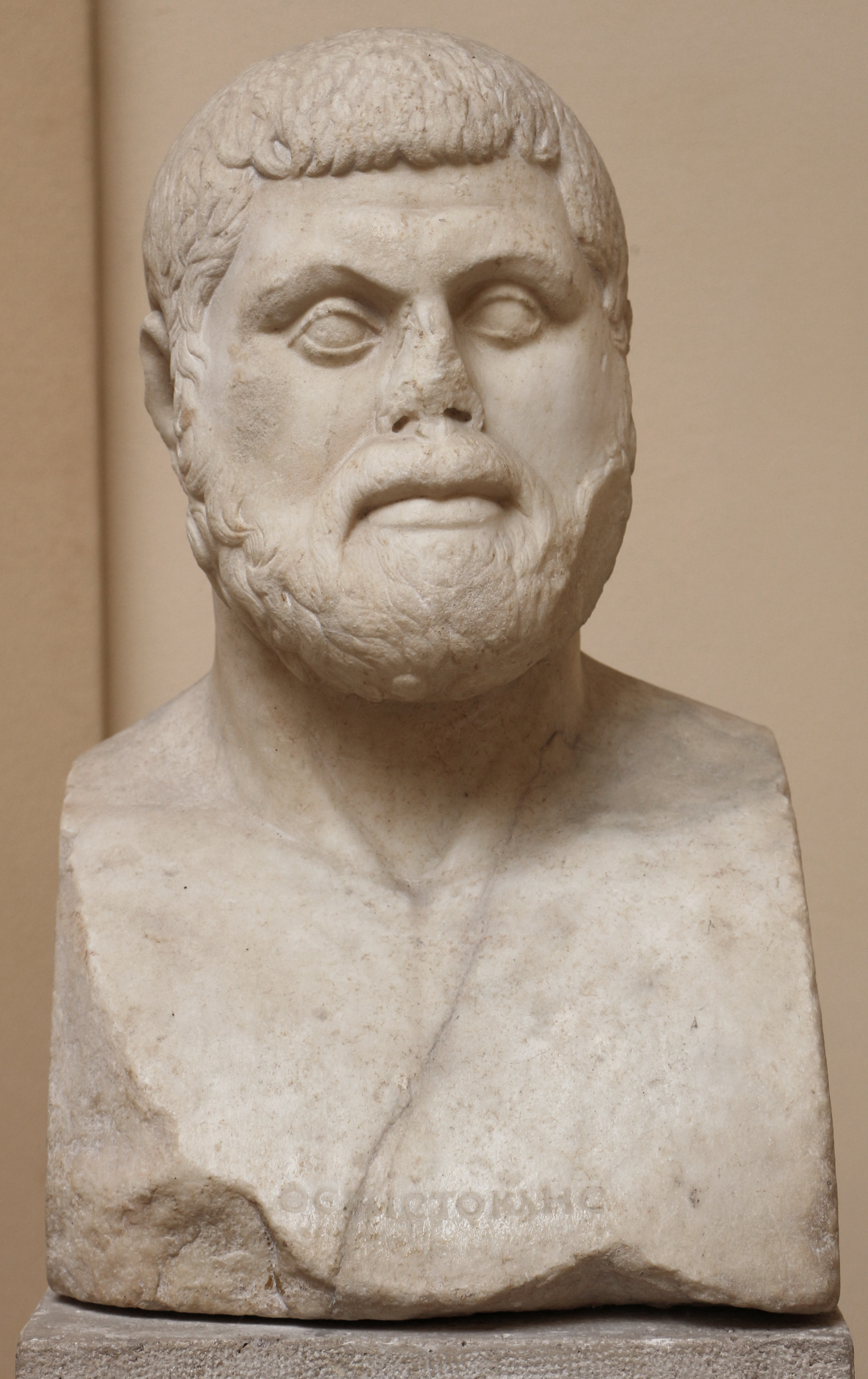
A Roman-era bust of Themistocles in "Severe style", based on a Greek original, in the Museo Archeologico Ostiense, Ostia, Rome, Italy. The lost original of this bust, dated to circa 470 BC, has been described as "the first true portrait of an individual European".

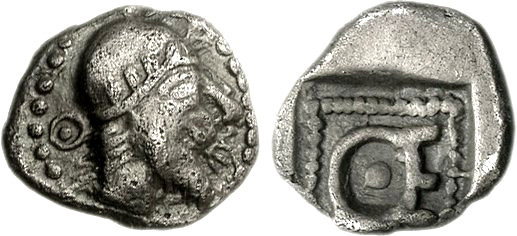
Hemiobol of Themistocles as Satrap of Magnesia, where he is seen wearing a tight bonnet with an olive wreath, reminiscent of the headwear of the Herakleia satrap.
