= Themistocles =

Athenian politician and general (c. 524–459 BC)

- Θεμιστοκλῆς
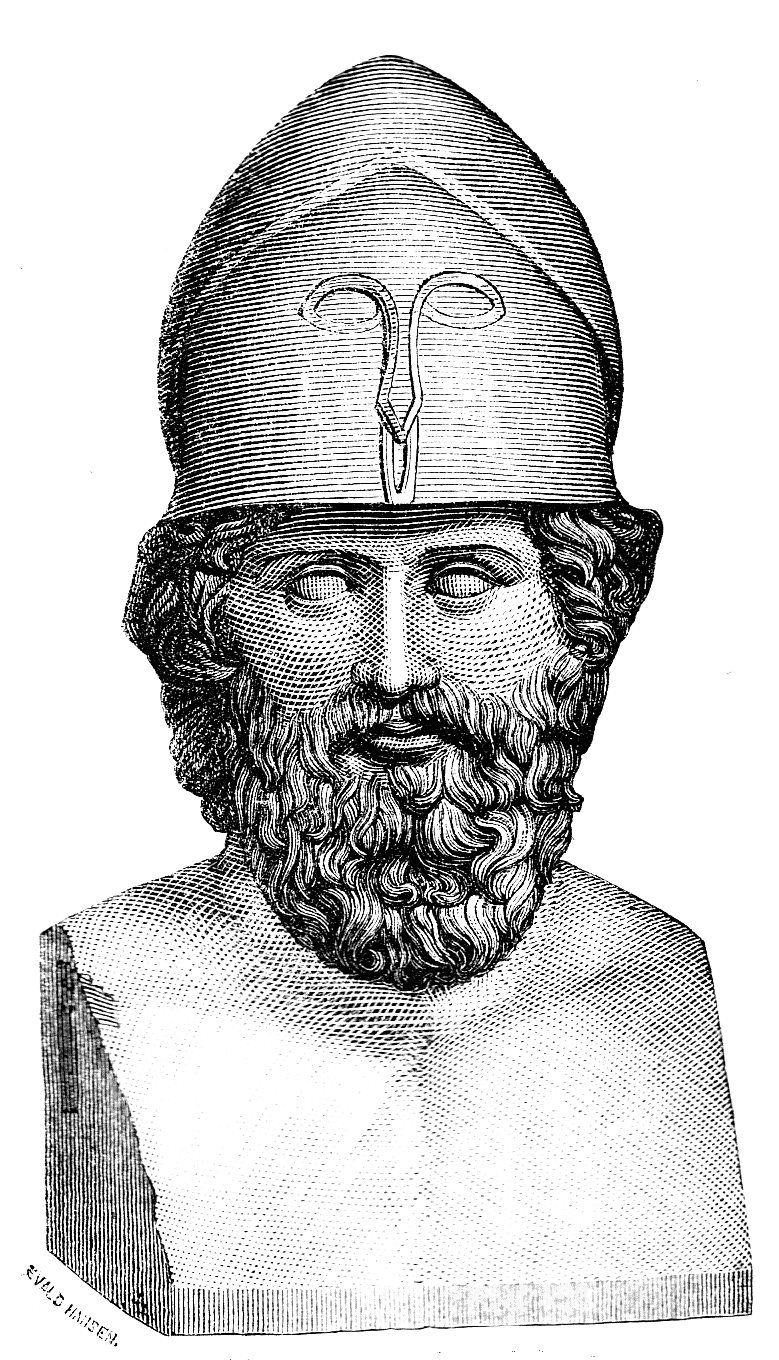
- Herm of Themistocles (1875 illustration)

Eponymous archon of Athens
- In office 493 – 492 BC
- Preceded by: Pythocritus
- Succeeded by: Diognetus

Governor of Magnesia
- In office 465 – 459 BC
- Succeeded by: Archeptolis

Personal details
- Born: c. 524 BC Phrearrhii (modern-day Greece)
- Died: c. 459 BC (aged 64–65) Magnesia on the Maeander (modern-day Tekin, Turkey)

Military service
- Allegiance: Athens (until 471 BC)
- Rank: Strategos
- Battles/wars: First Persian invasion of Greece; Battle of Marathon; Second Persian invasion of Greece; Battle of Artemisium; Battle of Salamis

Themistocles (/θəˈmɪstəkliːz/; Ancient Greek: Θεμιστοκλῆς, Themistoklēs; c. 524 – c. 459 BC) was an Athenian politician and general. He was one of a new breed of non-aristocratic politicians who rose to prominence in the early years of the Athenian democracy. As a politician, Themistocles was a populist, having the support of lower-class Athenians, and generally being at odds with the Athenian nobility. Elected archon in 493 BC, he convinced the polis to increase the naval power of Athens, a recurring theme in his political career. During the first Persian invasion of Greece, he fought at the Battle of Marathon (490 BC), and may have been one of the ten Athenian strategoi (generals) in that battle.

In the years after Marathon, and in the run-up to the second Persian invasion of 480–479 BC, Themistocles became the most prominent politician in Athens. He continued to advocate for a strong Athenian navy, and in 483 BC he persuaded the Athenians to build a fleet of 200 triremes; these proved crucial in the forthcoming conflict with Persia. During the second invasion, he commanded the Athenian navy at the battles of Artemisium and Salamis in 480 BC. Due to his subterfuge, the Allies successfully lured the Persian fleet into the Straits of Salamis, and the decisive Greek victory there was the turning point of the war. The invasion was conclusively repulsed the following year after the Persian defeat at the land battle of Plataea.

After the conflict ended, Themistocles continued his pre-eminence among Athenian politicians. However, he aroused the hostility of Sparta by ordering the re-fortification of Athens, and his perceived arrogance began to alienate him from the Athenians. In 472 or 471 BC, he was ostracised, and went into exile in Argos. The Spartans now saw an opportunity to destroy Themistocles, and implicated him in the alleged treasonous plot of 478 BC of their own general Pausanias. Themistocles thus fled from southern Greece. Alexander I of Macedon (r. 498–454 BC) temporarily gave him sanctuary at Pydna before he traveled to Asia Minor, where he entered the service of the Persian king Artaxerxes I (reigned 465–424 BC). He was made governor of Magnesia, and lived there for the rest of his life.

Themistocles died in 459 BC, probably of natural causes. His reputation was posthumously rehabilitated, and he was re-established as a hero of the Athenian, and indeed Greek, cause. Themistocles can still reasonably be thought of as "the man most instrumental in achieving the salvation of Greece" from the Persian threat, as Plutarch describes him. His naval policies would have a lasting impact on Athens as well, since maritime power became the cornerstone of the Athenian Empire and golden age. Thucydides assessed Themistocles as "a man who exhibited the most indubitable signs of genius; indeed, in this particular he has a claim on our admiration quite extraordinary and unparalleled".

== Family ==
Themistocles was born in the Attic deme of Phrearrhii around 524 BC, the son of the Athenian Greek Neocles, a Leontian also of Phrearrhii, who was, in the words of Plutarch "no very conspicuous man at Athens". His mother is more obscure; her name was either Euterpe or Abrotonum, and her place of origin has been given variously as Halicarnassus, Thrace, or Acarnania. Like many contemporaries, little is known of his early years. Some authors report that he was unruly as a child and was consequently disowned by his father. Plutarch considers this to be false. Plutarch indicates that, on account of his mother's background, Themistocles was considered something of an outsider; furthermore the family appear to have lived in an immigrant district of Athens, Cynosarges, outside the city walls. However, in an early example of his cunning, Themistocles persuaded "well-born" children to exercise with him in Cynosarges, thus breaking down the distinction between "alien and legitimate". Plutarch further reports that Themistocles was preoccupied, even as a child, with preparing for public life. His teacher is said to have told him: "My boy, you will be nothing insignificant, but definitely something great, either for good or evil."

Themistocles left three sons born of Archippe, the daughter of Lysander of Alopece: Archeptolis, Polyeuctus, and Cleophantus. He also had two sons older than these three, Neocles and Diocles. Neocles died when he was young, bitten by a horse, and Diocles was adopted by his grandfather, Lysander. Plato's Meno mentions Cleophantus as a most excellent horseman, but no equal to his father in deeds or virtue. Themistocles also had many daughters: Mnesiptolema, the product of his second marriage, married her step-brother Archeptolis and became priestess of Cybele; Italia was married to Panthoides of Chios; and Sybaris to Nicomedes the Athenian. After Themistocles died, his nephew Phrasicles went to Magnesia and married another daughter, Nicomache (with her brothers' consent). Phrasicles then took charge of her sister Asia, the youngest of all ten children.

== Political and military career ==
=== Background ===
Themistocles grew up in a period of upheaval in Athens. The tyrant Peisistratos had died in 527 BC, passing power to his sons, Hipparchus and Hippias. Hipparchus was murdered in 514 BC, and in response to this, Hippias became paranoid and started to rely increasingly on foreign mercenaries to keep a hold on power. The head of the powerful but exiled Alcmaeonid family, Cleisthenes, began to scheme to overthrow Hippias and return to Athens. In 510 BC, he persuaded the Spartan king Cleomenes I to launch a full-scale attack on Athens, which succeeded in overthrowing Hippias. However, in the aftermath, the other noble (eupatrid) families of Athens rejected Cleisthenes, electing Isagoras as archon, with the support of Cleomenes. On a personal level, Cleisthenes wanted to return to Athens; however, he also probably wanted to prevent Athens becoming a Spartan client state. Outmaneuvering the other nobles, he proposed to the Athenian people a radical program in which political power would be invested in the people—a "democracy". The Athenian people thus overthrew Isagoras, repelled a Spartan attack under Cleomenes, and invited Cleisthenes to return to Athens and put his plan into action. The establishment of the democracy was to radically change Athens: "And so it was that the Athenians found themselves suddenly a great power... they gave vivid proof of what equality and freedom of speech might achieve"

=== Early years of the democracy ===
The new system of government in Athens opened up a wealth of opportunity for men like Themistocles, who previously would have had no access to power. Moreover, the new institutions of the democracy required skills that had previously been unimportant in government. Themistocles was to prove himself a master of the new system; "he could infight, he could network, he could spin... and crucially, he knew how to make himself visible." Themistocles moved to the Ceramicus, a down-market part of Athens. This move marked him out as a 'man of the people', and allowed him to interact more easily with ordinary citizens. He began building up a support base among these newly empowered citizens:

[H]e wooed the poor; and they, not used to being courted, duly loved him back. Touring the taverns, the markets, the docks, canvassing where no politician had thought to canvas before, making sure never to forget a single voter's name, Themistocles had set his eyes on a radical new constituency...

However, he took care to ensure that he did not alienate the nobility of Athens. He began to practice law, the first person in Athens to prepare for public life in this way. His ability as attorney and arbitrator, used in the service of the common people, gained him further popularity.

=== Archonship ===
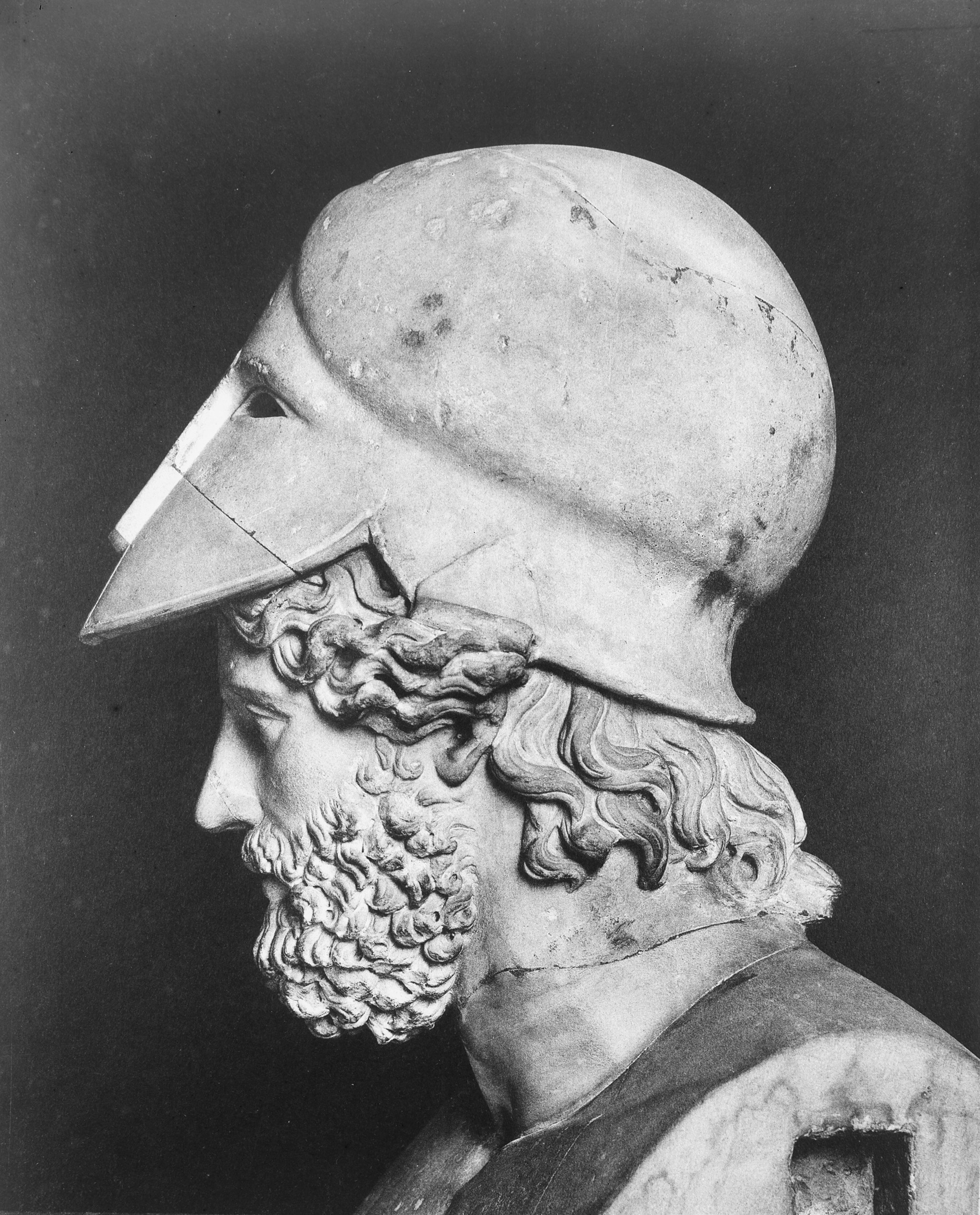
Profile view of an ancient Greek bust of Themistocles

Themistocles probably turned 30 in 494 BC, which qualified him to become an archon, the highest of the magistracies in Athens. On the back of his popularity, he evidently decided to run for this office and was elected Archon Eponymous, the highest government office in the following year (493 BC). Themistocles's archonship saw the beginnings of a major theme in his career; the advancement of Athenian sea-power. Under his guidance, the Athenians began the building of a new port at Piraeus, to replace the existing facilities at Phalerum. Although further away from Athens, Piraeus offered three natural harbours, and could be easily fortified. Since Athens was to become an essentially maritime power during the 5th century BC, Themistocles's policies were to have huge significance for the future of Athens, and indeed Greece. In advancing naval power, Themistocles was probably advocating a course of action he thought essential for the long-term prospects of Athens. However, as Plutarch implies, since naval power relied on the mass mobilisation of the common citizens (thetes) as rowers, such a policy put more power into the hands of average Athenians—and thus into Themistocles's own hands.

=== Rivalry with Aristides ===
After Marathon, probably in 489, Miltiades, the hero of the battle, was seriously wounded in an abortive attempt to capture Paros. Taking advantage of his incapacitation, the powerful Alcmaeonid family arranged for him to be prosecuted. The Athenian aristocracy, and indeed Greek aristocrats in general, were loath to see one person pre-eminent, and such maneuvers were commonplace. Miltiades was given a massive fine for the crime of 'deceiving the Athenian people', but died weeks later as a result of his wound. In the wake of this prosecution, the Athenian people chose to use a new institution of the democracy, which had been part of Cleisthenes' reforms, but remained so far unused. This was 'ostracism'—each Athenian citizen was required to write on a shard of pottery (ostrakon) the name of a politician that they wished to see exiled for a period of ten years. This may have been triggered by Miltiades' prosecution, and used by the Athenians to try to stop such power-games among the noble families. Certainly, in the years (487 BC) following, the heads of the prominent families, including the Alcmaeonids, were exiled. The career of a politician in Athens thus became fraught with more difficulty, since displeasing the population was likely to result in exile.

Themistocles, with his power-base firmly established among the poor, moved naturally to fill the vacuum left by Miltiades' death, and in that decade became the most influential politician in Athens. However, the support of the nobility began to coalesce around the man who would become Themistocles's great rival—Aristides. Aristides cast himself as Themistocles's opposite—virtuous, honest and incorruptible—and his followers called him "the just". Plutarch suggests that the rivalry between the two had begun when they competed over the love of a boy: "... they were rivals for the affection of the beautiful Stesilaus of Ceos, and were passionate beyond all moderation."

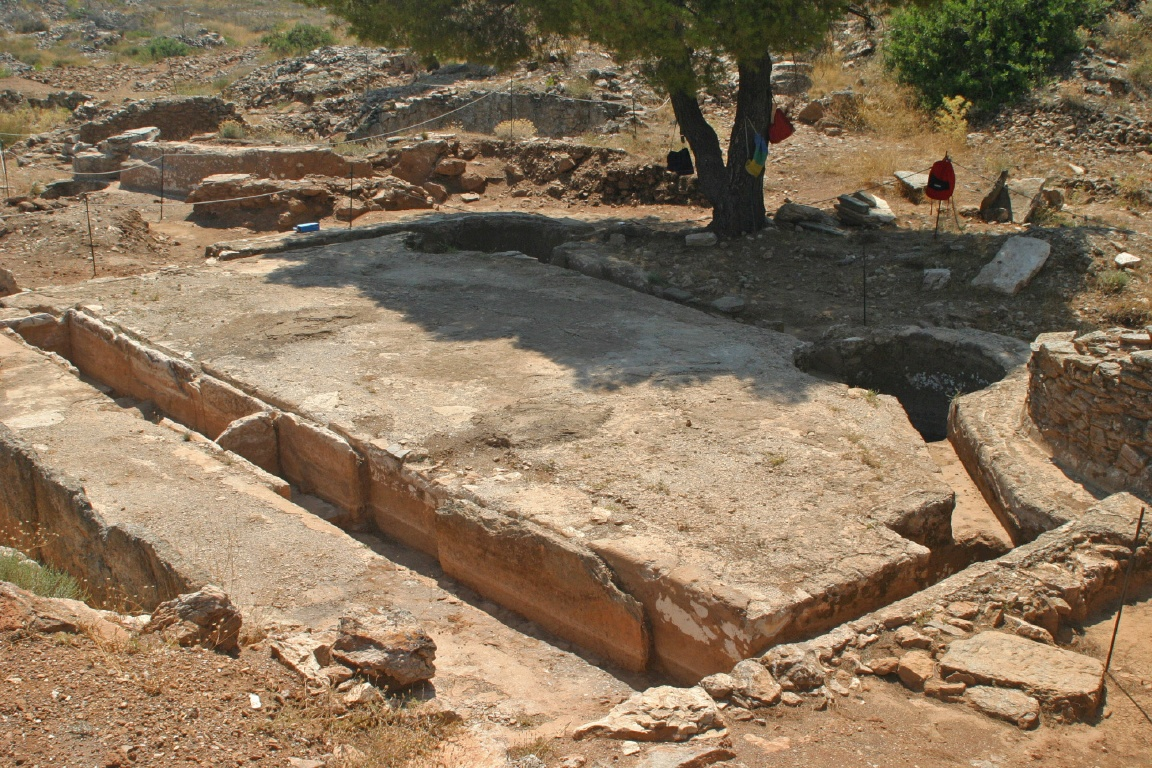
A sluicing tank for silver ore, excavated at Laurium, Attica

During the decade, Themistocles continued to advocate the expansion of Athenian naval power. The Athenians were certainly aware throughout this period that the Persian interest in Greece had not ended; Darius' son and successor, Xerxes I, had continued the preparations for the invasion of Greece. Themistocles seems to have realised that for the Greeks to survive the coming onslaught required a Greek navy that could hope to face up to the Persian navy, and he therefore attempted to persuade the Athenians to build such a fleet. Aristides, as champion of the zeugites (the upper, 'hoplite-class') vigorously opposed such a policy.

In 483 BC, a massive new seam of silver was found in the Athenian mines of Laurion. Themistocles proposed that the silver should be used to build a new fleet of 200 triremes, while Aristides suggested it should instead be distributed among the Athenian citizens. Themistocles avoided mentioning Persia, deeming that it was too distant a threat for the Athenians to act on, and instead focused their attention on Aegina. At the time, Athens was embroiled in a long-running war with the Aeginetans, and building a fleet would allow the Athenians to finally defeat them at sea. As a result, Themistocles's motion was carried easily, although only 100 triremes were to be built. Aristides refused to countenance this; conversely Themistocles was not pleased that only 100 ships would be built. Tension between the two camps built over the winter, so that the ostracism of 482 BC became a direct contest between Themistocles and Aristides. In what has been characterized as the first referendum, Aristides was ostracised, and Themistocles's policies were endorsed. Indeed, becoming aware of the Persian preparations for the coming invasion, the Athenians voted for the construction of more ships than Themistocles had initially asked for. In the run-up to the Persian invasion, Themistocles had thus become the foremost politician in Athens.

=== Second Persian invasion of Greece ===
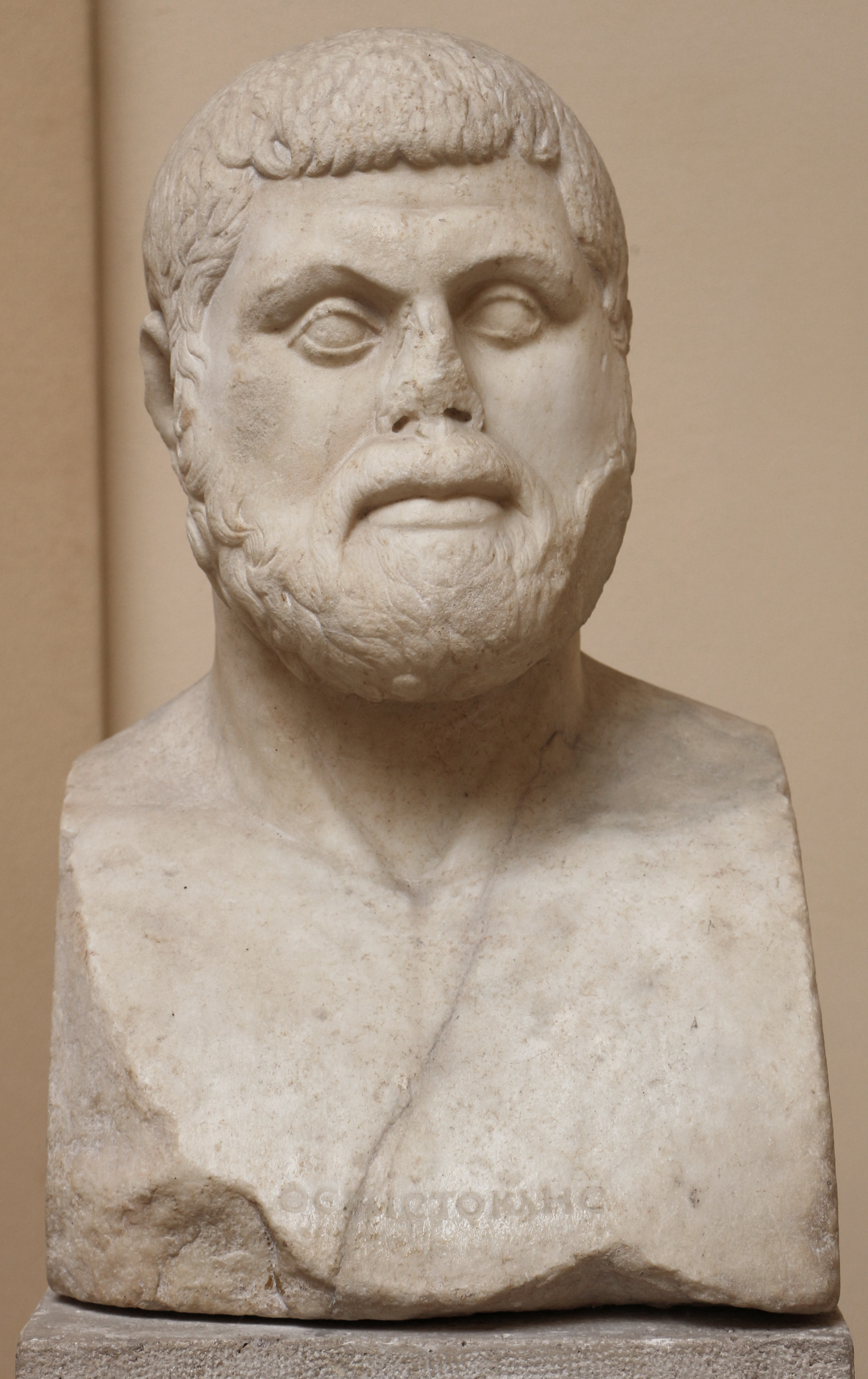
A Roman-era bust of Themistocles in "Severe style", based on a Greek original, in the Museo Archeologico Ostiense, Ostia, Rome, Italy. The lost original of this bust, dated to c. 470 BC, has been described as "the first true portrait of an individual European".

In 481 BC a congress of Greek city-states was held, during which 30 or so states agreed to ally themselves against the forthcoming invasion. The Spartans and Athenians were foremost in this alliance, being sworn enemies of the Persians. The Spartans claimed the command of land forces, and since the Greek (hereafter referred to as "Allied") fleet would be dominated by Athens, Themistocles tried to claim command of the naval forces. However, the other naval powers, including Corinth and Aegina, refused to give command to the Athenians, and Themistocles pragmatically backed down. Instead, as a compromise, the Spartans (an insignificant naval power), in the person of Eurybiades, were to command the naval forces. Herodotus is clear, however, that Themistocles commanded the fleet in all but name.

The congress met again in the spring of 480 BC. A Thessalian delegation suggested that the allies could muster in the narrow Vale of Tempe, on the borders of Thessaly, and thereby block Xerxes' advance. A force of 10,000 hoplites was dispatched under the command of the Spartan polemarch Euenetus and Themistocles to the Vale of Tempe, which they believed the Persian army would have to pass through. However, once there, Alexander I of Macedon warned them that the vale could be bypassed in several ways and that the army of Xerxes was overwhelmingly large, and the Greeks retreated. Shortly afterwards, they received the news that Xerxes had crossed the Hellespont.

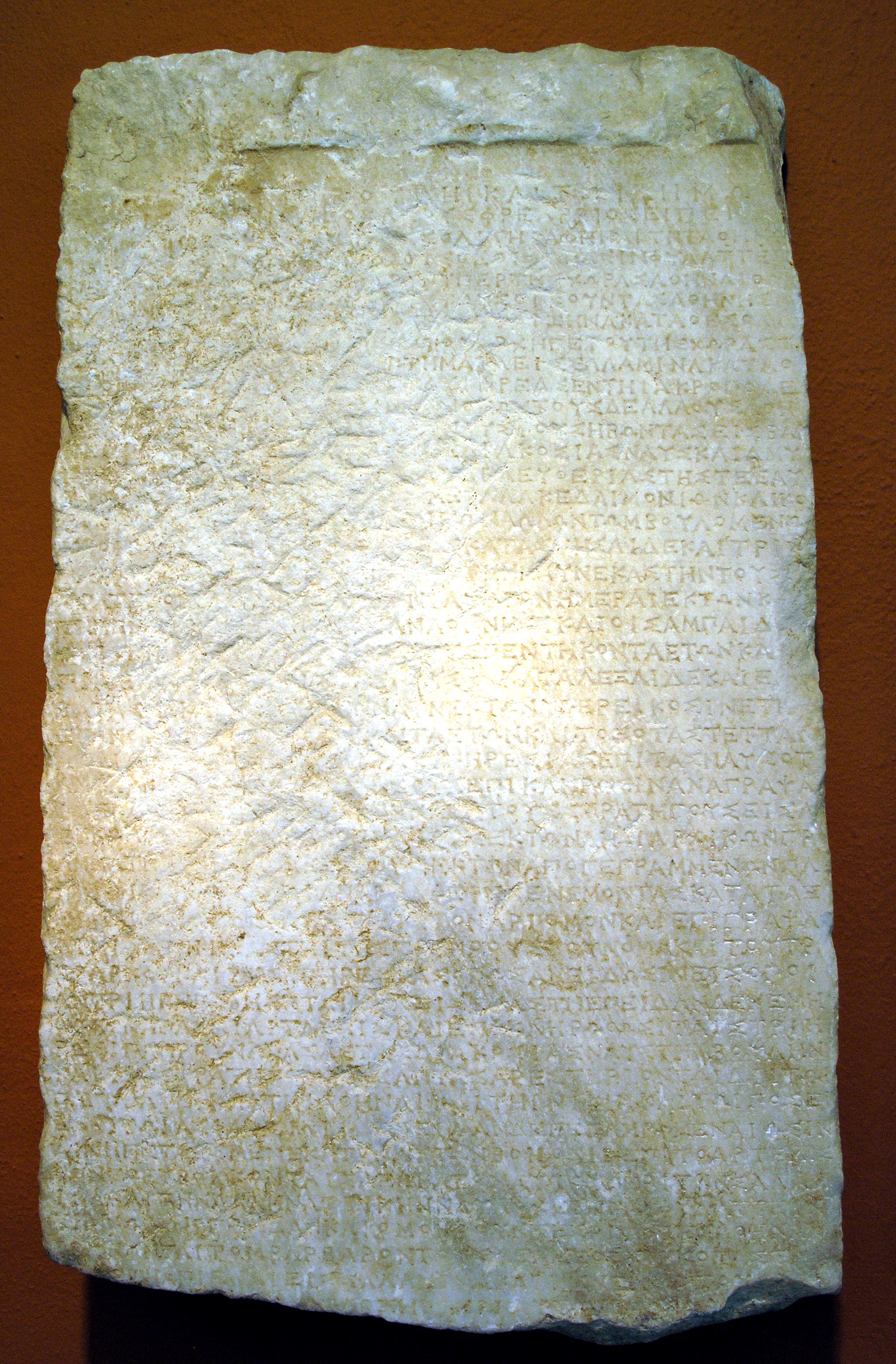
Decree of Themistocles, National Archaeological Museum of Athens, 13330

Themistocles now developed a second strategy. The route to southern Greece (Boeotia, Attica and the Peloponnesus) would require the army of Xerxes to travel through the very narrow pass of Thermopylae. This could easily be blocked by the Greek hoplites, despite the overwhelming numbers of Persians; furthermore, to prevent the Persians bypassing Thermopylae by sea, the Athenian and allied navies could block the straits of Artemisium. However, after the Tempe debacle, it was uncertain whether the Spartans would be willing to march out from the Peloponnesus again. To persuade the Spartans to defend Attica, Themistocles had to show them that the Athenians were willing to do everything necessary for the success of the alliance. In short, the entire Athenian fleet must be dispatched to Artemisium.

To do this, every able-bodied Athenian male would be required to man the ships. This in turn meant that the Athenians must prepare to abandon Athens. Persuading the Athenians to take this course was one of the highlights of Themistocles's career. As Holland has it:

What precise heights of oratory he attained, what stirring and memorable phrases he pronounced, we have no way of knowing...only by the effect it had on the assembly can we gauge what surely must have been its electric and vivifying quality—for Themistocles's audacious proposals, when put to the vote, were ratified. The Athenian people, facing the gravest moment of peril in their history, committed themselves once and for all to the alien element of the sea, and put their faith in a man whose ambitions many had long profoundly dreaded.

His proposals accepted, Themistocles issued orders for the women and children of Athens to be sent to the city of Troezen, safely inside the Peloponnesus. He was then able to travel to a meeting of the Allies, at which he proposed his strategy; with the Athenian fleet fully committed to the defence of Greece, the other Allies accepted his proposals.

==== Battle of Artemisium ====
Thus, in August 480 BC, when the Persian army was approaching Thessaly, the Allied fleet sailed to Artemisium, and the Allied army marched to Thermopylae. Themistocles himself took command of the Athenian contingent of the fleet and went to Artemisium. When the Persian fleet finally arrived at Artemisium after a significant delay, Eurybiades, who both Herodotus and Plutarch suggest was not the most inspiring commander, wished to sail away without fighting. At this point Themistocles accepted a large bribe from the local people for the fleet to remain at Artemisium, and he used some of it to bribe Eurybiades to remain, while pocketing the rest. From this point on, Themistocles appears to have been more or less in charge of the Allied effort at Artemisium. Over three days of battle, the Allies held their own against the much larger Persian fleet, but sustained significant losses. However, the loss of the simultaneous Battle of Thermopylae to the Persians made their continued presence at Artemisium irrelevant, and the Allies thus evacuated. According to Herodotus, Themistocles left messages at every place where the Persian fleet might stop for drinking water, asking the Ionians in the Persian fleet to defect, or at least fight badly. Even if this did not work, Themistocles apparently intended that Xerxes would at least begin to suspect the Ionians, thereby sowing dissension in the Persian ranks.

==== Battle of Salamis ====
In the aftermath of Thermopylae, Boeotia fell to the Persians, who then began to advance on Athens. The Peloponnesian Allies prepared to now defend the Isthmus of Corinth, thus abandoning Athens to the Persians. From Artemisium, the Allied fleet sailed to the island of Salamis, where the Athenian ships helped with the final evacuation of Athens. The Peloponnesian contingents wanted to sail to the coast of the Isthmus to concentrate forces with the army. However, Themistocles tried to convince them to remain in the Straits of Salamis, invoking the lessons of Artemisium; "battle in close conditions works to our advantage". After threatening to sail with the whole Athenian people into exile in Sicily, he eventually persuaded the other Allies, whose security after all relied on the Athenian navy, to accept his plan. Therefore, even after Athens had fallen to the Persians, and the Persian navy had arrived off the coast of Salamis, the Allied navy remained in the Straits. Themistocles appears to have been aiming to fight a battle that would cripple the Persian navy, and thus guarantee the security of the Peloponnesus.

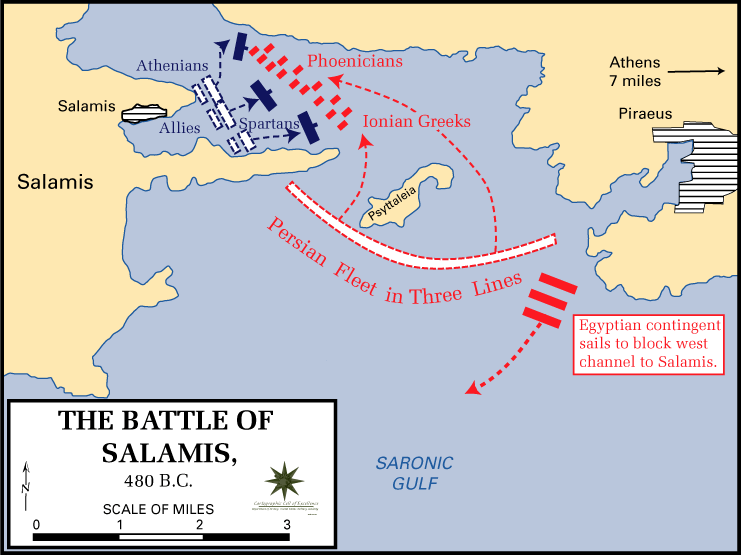
Events of the Battle of Salamis

To bring about this battle, Themistocles used a cunning mix of subterfuge and misinformation, psychologically exploiting Xerxes' desire to finish the invasion. Xerxes' actions indicate that he was keen to finish the conquest of Greece in 480 BC, and to do this, he needed a decisive victory over the Allied fleet. Themistocles sent a servant, Sicinnus, to Xerxes, with a message proclaiming that Themistocles was "on the king's side, and prefers that your affairs prevail, not the Hellenes'." Themistocles claimed that the Allied commanders were infighting, that the Peloponnesians were planning to evacuate that very night, and that to gain victory all the Persians needed to do was to block the straits. In performing this subterfuge, Themistocles seems to have been trying to lure the Persian fleet into the Straits. The message also had a secondary purpose: In the event of an Allied defeat, the Athenians might receive some degree of mercy from Xerxes (having indicated their readiness to submit). At any rate, this was exactly the kind of news that Xerxes wanted to hear. Xerxes evidently took the bait, and the Persian fleet was sent out to effect the block. Perhaps overconfident and expecting no resistance, the Persian navy sailed into the Straits, only to find that, far from disintegrating, the Allied navy was ready for battle.

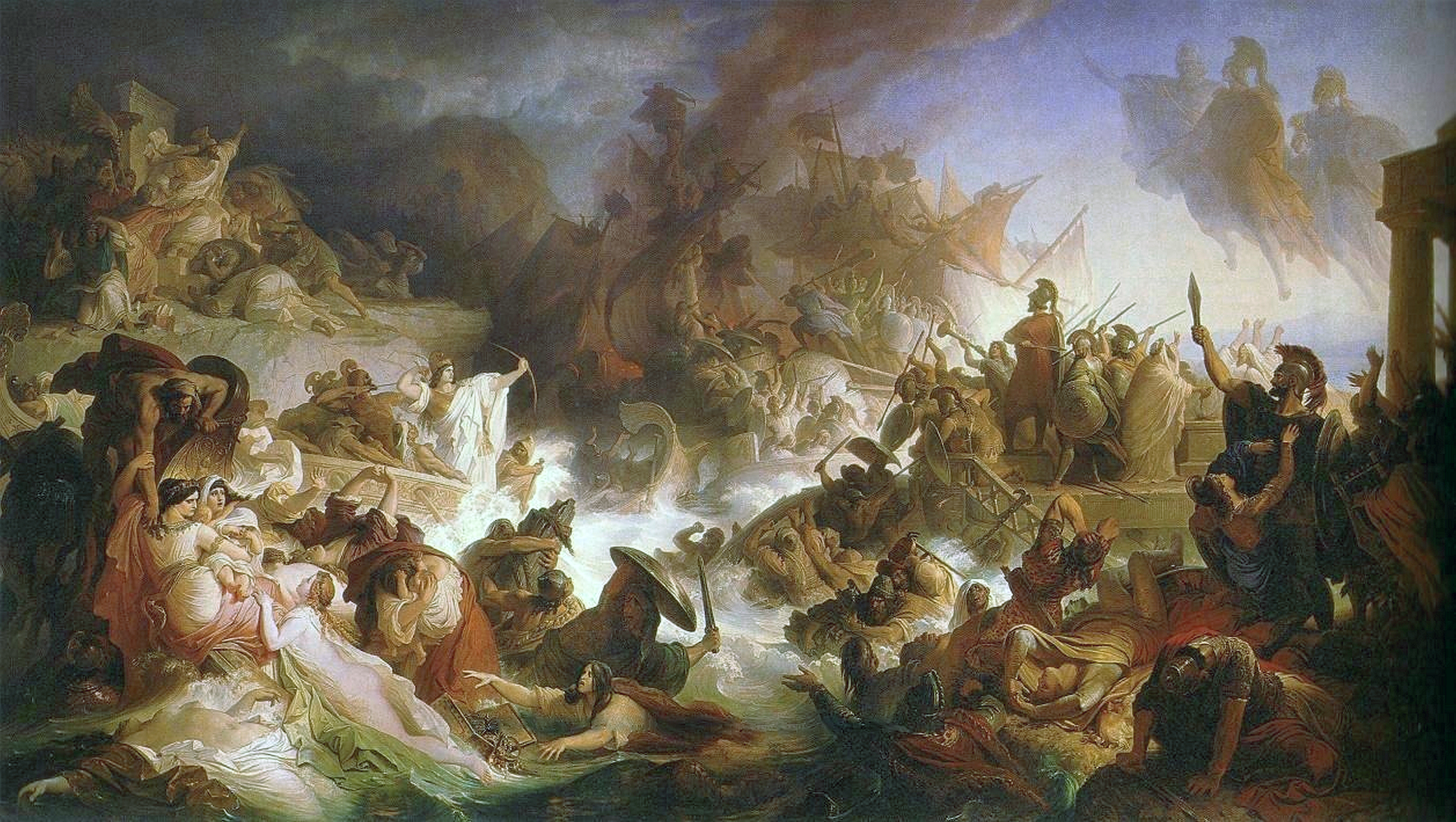
Romantic interpretation of the Battle of Salamis by Wilhelm von Kaulbach. Artemisia of Caria is seen shooting arrows in the direction of the Greeks led by Themistocles.

According to Herodotus, after the Persian navy began its maneuvers, Aristides arrived at the Allied camp from Aegina. Aristides had been recalled from exile along with the other ostracised Athenians on the order of Themistocles, so that Athens might be united against the Persians. Aristides told Themistocles that the Persian fleet had encircled the Allies, which greatly pleased Themistocles, as he now knew that the Persians had walked into his trap. The Allied commanders seem to have taken this news rather uncomplainingly, and Holland therefore suggests that they were party to Themistocles's ruse all along. Either way, the Allies prepared for battle, and Themistocles delivered a speech to the marines before they embarked on the ships. In the ensuing battle, the cramped conditions in the Straits hindered the much larger Persian navy, which became disarrayed, and the Allies took advantage to win a famous victory.

Salamis was the turning point in the second Persian invasion, and indeed the Greco-Persian Wars in general. While the battle did not end the Persian invasion, it effectively ensured that all Greece would not be conquered, and allowed the Allies to go on the offensive in 479 BC. A number of historians believe that Salamis is one of the most significant battles in human history. Since Themistocles's long-standing advocacy of Athenian naval power enabled the Allied fleet to fight, and his stratagem brought about the Battle of Salamis, it is probably not an exaggeration to say, as Plutarch does, that Themistocles, "...is thought to have been the man most instrumental in achieving the salvation of Hellas."

==== Autumn 480 – Winter 479 BC ====
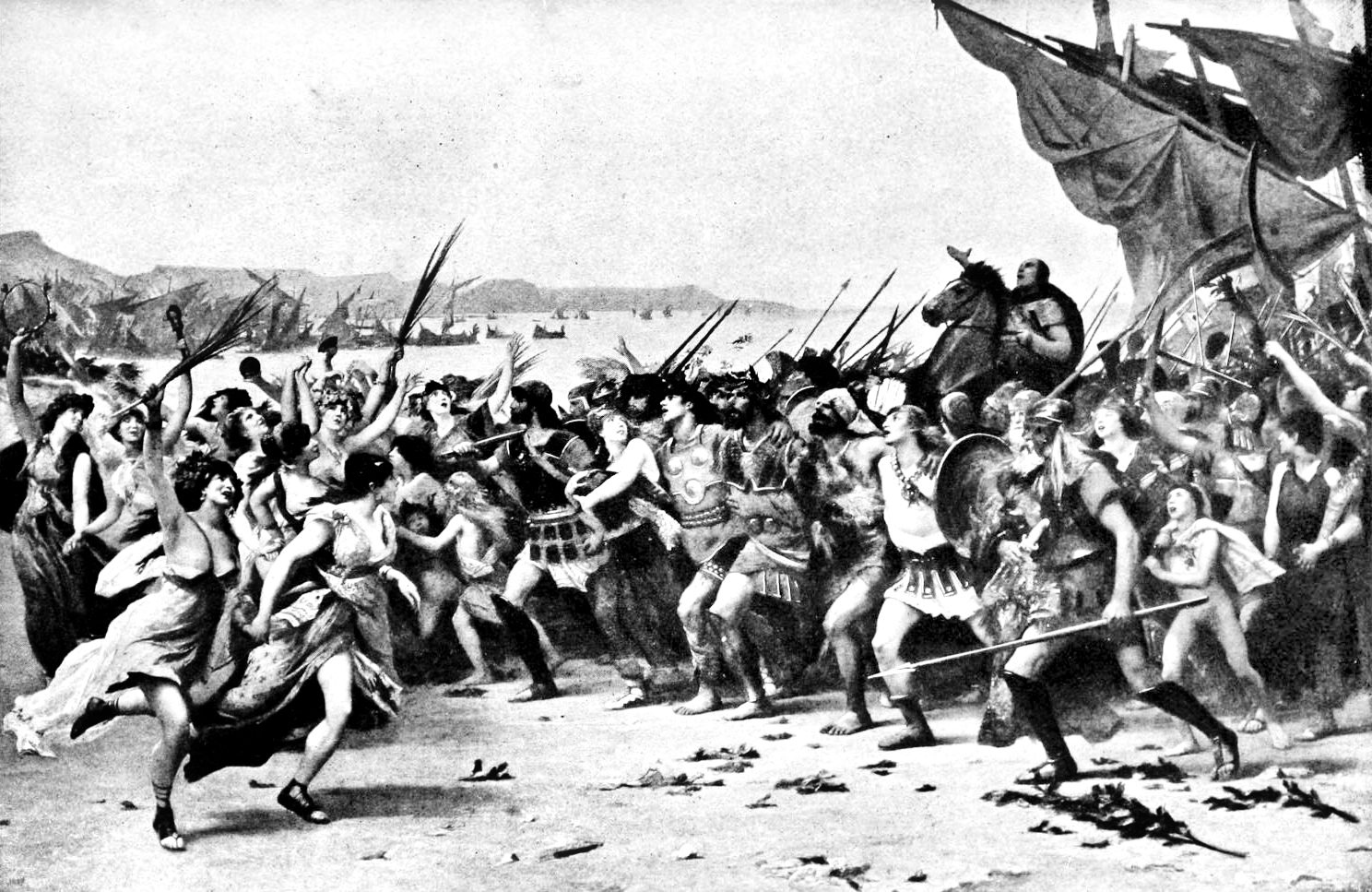
19th century illustration of the triumph of Themistocles following the Battle of Salamis

The Allied victory at Salamis ended the immediate threat to Greece, and Xerxes now returned to Asia with part of the army, leaving his general Mardonius to attempt to complete the conquest. Mardonius wintered in Boeotia and Thessaly, and the Athenians were thus able to return to their city, which had been burnt and razed by the Persians, for the winter. For the Athenians, and Themistocles personally, the winter would be a testing one. The Peloponnesians refused to countenance marching north of the Isthmus to fight the Persian army; the Athenians tried to shame them into doing so, with no success.

During the winter, the Allies held a meeting at Corinth to celebrate their success, and award prizes for achievement. However, perhaps tired of the Athenians pointing out their role at Salamis, and of their demands for the Allies to march north, the Allies awarded the prize for civic achievement to Aegina. Furthermore, although the admirals all voted for Themistocles in second place, they all voted for themselves in first place, so that no-one won the prize for individual achievement. In response, realising the importance of the Athenian fleet to their security, and probably seeking to massage Themistocles's ego, the Spartans brought Themistocles to Sparta. There, he was awarded a special prize "for his wisdom and cleverness", and won high praise from all. Furthermore, Plutarch reports that at the next Olympic Games:

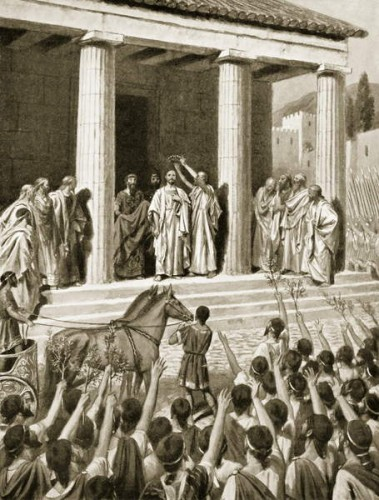
Themistocles honoured at Sparta.

[When] Themistocles entered the stadium, the audience neglected the contestants all day long to gaze on him, and pointed him out with admiring applause to visiting strangers, so that he too was delighted, and confessed to his friends that he was now reaping in full measure the harvest of his toils in behalf of Hellas.

After returning to Athens in the winter, Plutarch reports that Themistocles made a proposal to the city while the Greek fleet was wintering at Pagasae:

Themistocles once declared to the people [of Athens] that he had devised a certain measure which could not be revealed to them, though it would be helpful and salutary for the city, and they ordered that Aristides alone should hear what it was and pass judgment on it. So Themistocles told Aristides that his purpose was to burn the naval station of the confederate Hellenes, for that in this way the Athenians would be greatest, and lords of all. Then Aristides came before the people and said of the deed which Themistocles purposed to do, that none other could be more advantageous, and none more unjust. On hearing this, the Athenians ordained that Themistocles cease from his purpose.

==== Spring–Summer 479 BC ====
However, as happened to many prominent individuals in the Athenian democracy, Themistocles's fellow citizens grew jealous of his success, and possibly tired of his boasting. It is probable that in early 479 BC, Themistocles was stripped of his command; instead, Xanthippus was to command the Athenian fleet, and Aristides the land forces. Though Themistocles was no doubt politically and militarily active for the rest of the campaign, no mention of his activities in 479 BC is made in the ancient sources. In the summer of that year, after receiving an Athenian ultimatum, the Peloponnesians finally agreed to assemble an army and march to confront Mardonius, who had reoccupied Athens in June. At the decisive Battle of Plataea, the Allies destroyed the Persian army, while apparently on the same day, the Allied navy destroyed the remnants of the Persian fleet at the Battle of Mycale. These twin victories completed the Allied triumph, and ended the Persian threat to Greece.

=== Rebuilding of Athens after the Persian invasion ===
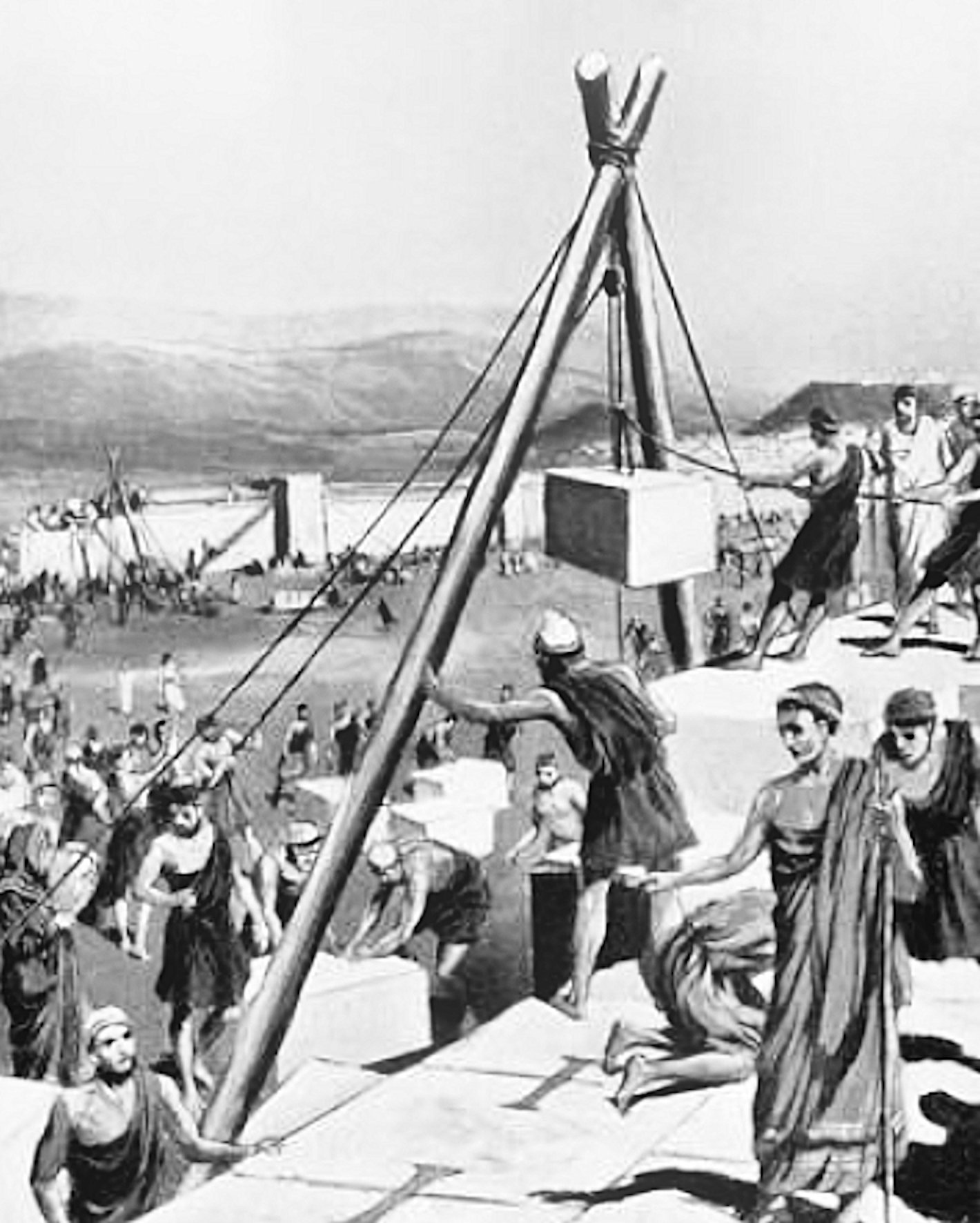
Athenians rebuilding their city under the direction of Themistocles.

Whatever the cause of Themistocles's unpopularity in 479 BC, it obviously did not last long. Both Diodorus Siculus and Plutarch suggest he was quickly restored to the favour of the Athenians. Indeed, after 479 BC, he seems to have enjoyed a relatively long period of popularity.

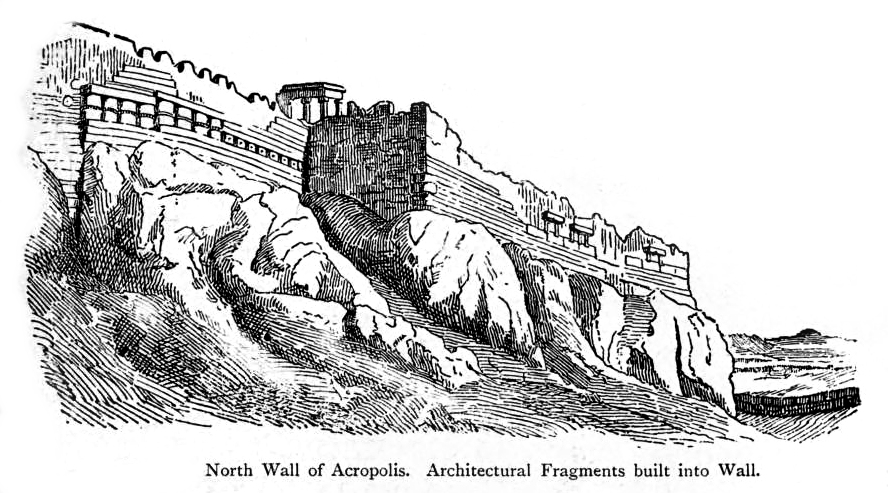
The northern wall of the Acropolis of Athens, built by Themistocles with built-in fragments of destroyed temples

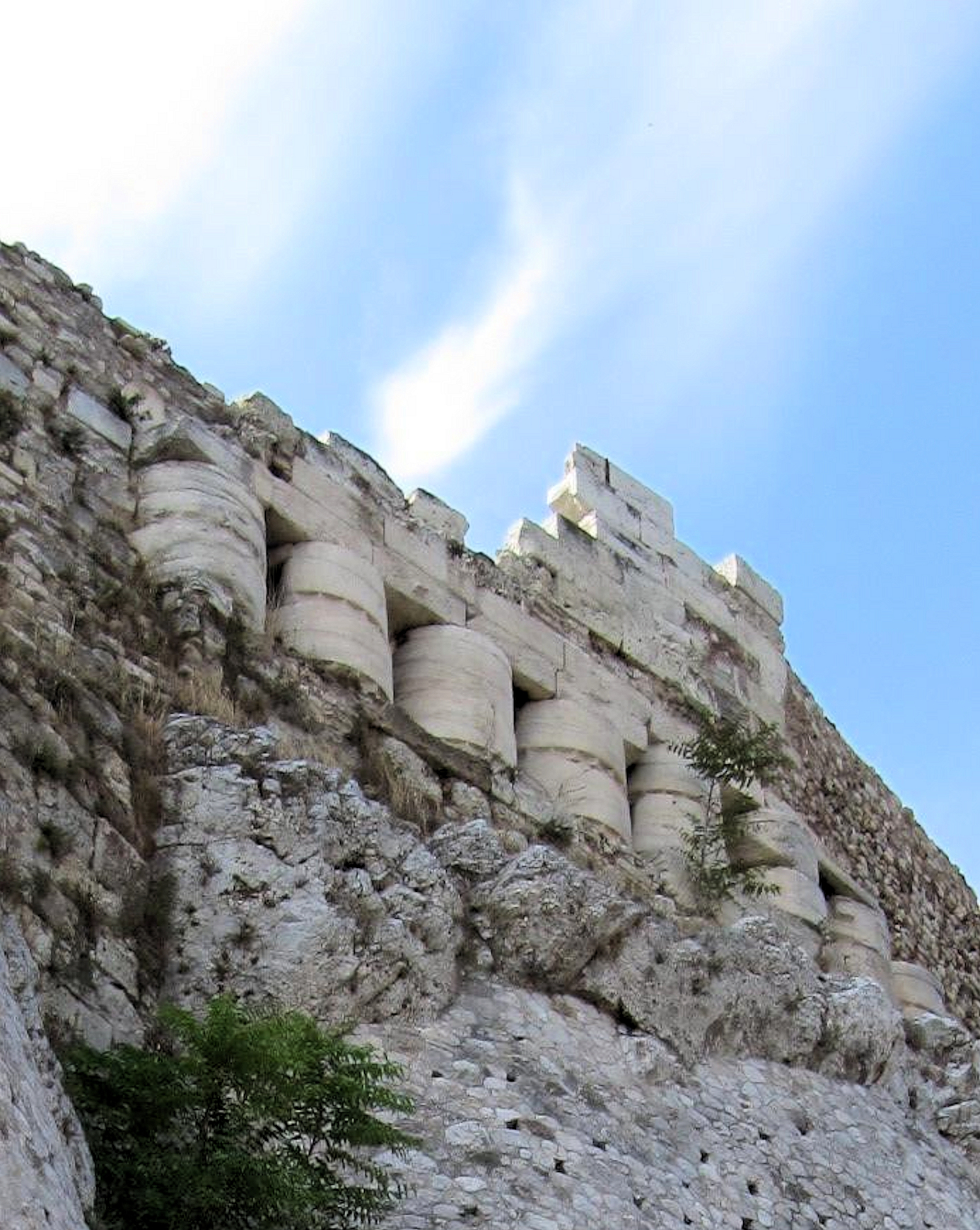
Column drums of the destroyed Older Parthenon, reused in building-up the North wall of the Acropolis, by Themistocles

In the aftermath of the invasion and the Destruction of Athens by the Achaemenids, the Athenians began rebuilding their city under the guidance of Themistocles in the autumn of 479 BC. They wished to restore the fortifications of Athens, but the Spartans objected on the grounds that no place north of the Isthmus should be left that the Persians could use as a fortress. Themistocles urged the citizens to build the fortifications as quickly as possible, then went to Sparta as an ambassador to answer the charges levelled by the Spartans. There, he assured them that no building work was on-going, and urged them to send emissaries to Athens to see for themselves. By the time the ambassadors arrived, the Athenians had finished building, and then detained the Spartan ambassadors when they complained about the presence of the fortifications. By delaying in this manner, Themistocles gave the Athenians enough time to fortify the city, and thus ward off any Spartan attack aimed at preventing the re-fortification of Athens. Furthermore, the Spartans were obliged to repatriate Themistocles in order to free their own ambassadors. However, this episode may be seen as the beginning of the Spartan mistrust of Themistocles, which would return to haunt him.

Themistocles also now returned to his naval policy, and more ambitious undertakings that would increase the dominant position of his native state. He further extended and fortified the port complex at Piraeus, and "fastened the city [Athens] to the Piraeus, and the land to the sea". Themistocles probably aimed to make Athens the dominant naval power in the Aegean. Indeed, Athens would create the Delian League in 478 BC, uniting the naval power of the Aegean Islands and Ionia under Athenian leadership. Themistocles introduced tax breaks for merchants and artisans, to attract both people and trade to the city to make Athens a great mercantile centre. He also instructed the Athenians to build 20 triremes per year, to ensure that their dominance in naval matters continued. Plutarch reports that Themistocles also secretly proposed to destroy the beached ships of the other Allied navies to ensure complete naval dominance—but was overruled by Aristides and the council of Athens.

=== Fall and exile ===
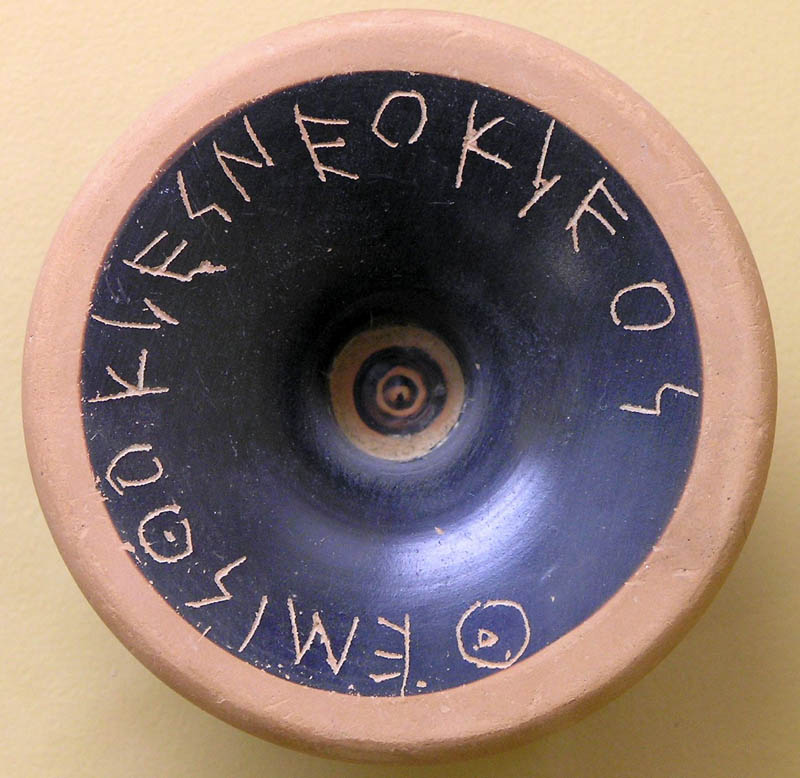
Ostracon with inscription: "Themist[h]ocles, son of Neocles"

It seems clear that, towards the end of the decade, Themistocles had begun to accrue enemies, and had become arrogant; moreover his fellow citizens had become jealous of his prestige and power. The Rhodian poet Timocreon was among his most eloquent enemies, composing slanderous drinking songs. Meanwhile, the Spartans actively worked against him, trying to promote Cimon (son of Miltiades) as a rival to Themistocles. Furthermore, after the treason and disgrace of the Spartan general Pausanias, the Spartans tried to implicate Themistocles in the plot; he was, however, acquitted of these charges. In Athens itself, he lost favour by building a sanctuary of Artemis, with the epithet Aristoboulẽ ("of good counsel") near his home, a blatant reference to his own role in delivering Greece from the Persian invasion. Eventually, in either 472 or 471 BC, he was ostracised. In itself, this did not mean that Themistocles had done anything wrong; ostracism, in the words of Plutarch, "was not a penalty, but a way of pacifying and alleviating that jealousy which delights to humble the eminent, breathing out its malice into this disfranchisement."

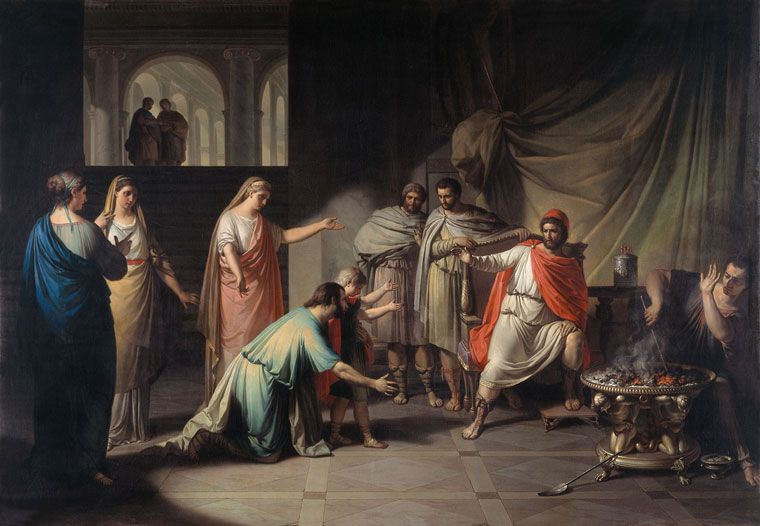
Themistocles finds refuge with King Admetus.

Themistocles first went to live in exile in Argos. However, perceiving that they now had a prime opportunity to bring Themistocles down for good, the Spartans again levelled accusations of Themistocles's complicity in Pausanias's treason. They demanded that he be tried by the 'Congress of Greeks', rather than in Athens, although it seems that in the end he was actually summoned to Athens to stand trial. Perhaps realising he had little hope of surviving this trial, Themistocles fled, first to Kerkyra, and thence to Admetus, king of Molossia. Themistocles's flight probably only served to convince his accusers of his guilt, and he was declared a traitor in Athens, his property to be confiscated. Both Diodorus and Plutarch considered that the charges were false, and made solely for the purposes of destroying Themistocles. The Spartans sent ambassadors to Admetus, threatening that the whole of Greece would go to war with the Molossians unless they surrendered Themistocles. Admetus, however, allowed Themistocles to escape, giving him a large sum of gold to aid him on his way. Themistocles then fled from Greece, apparently never to return, thus effectively bringing his political career to an end.

== Later life in the Achaemenid Empire, death, and descendants ==
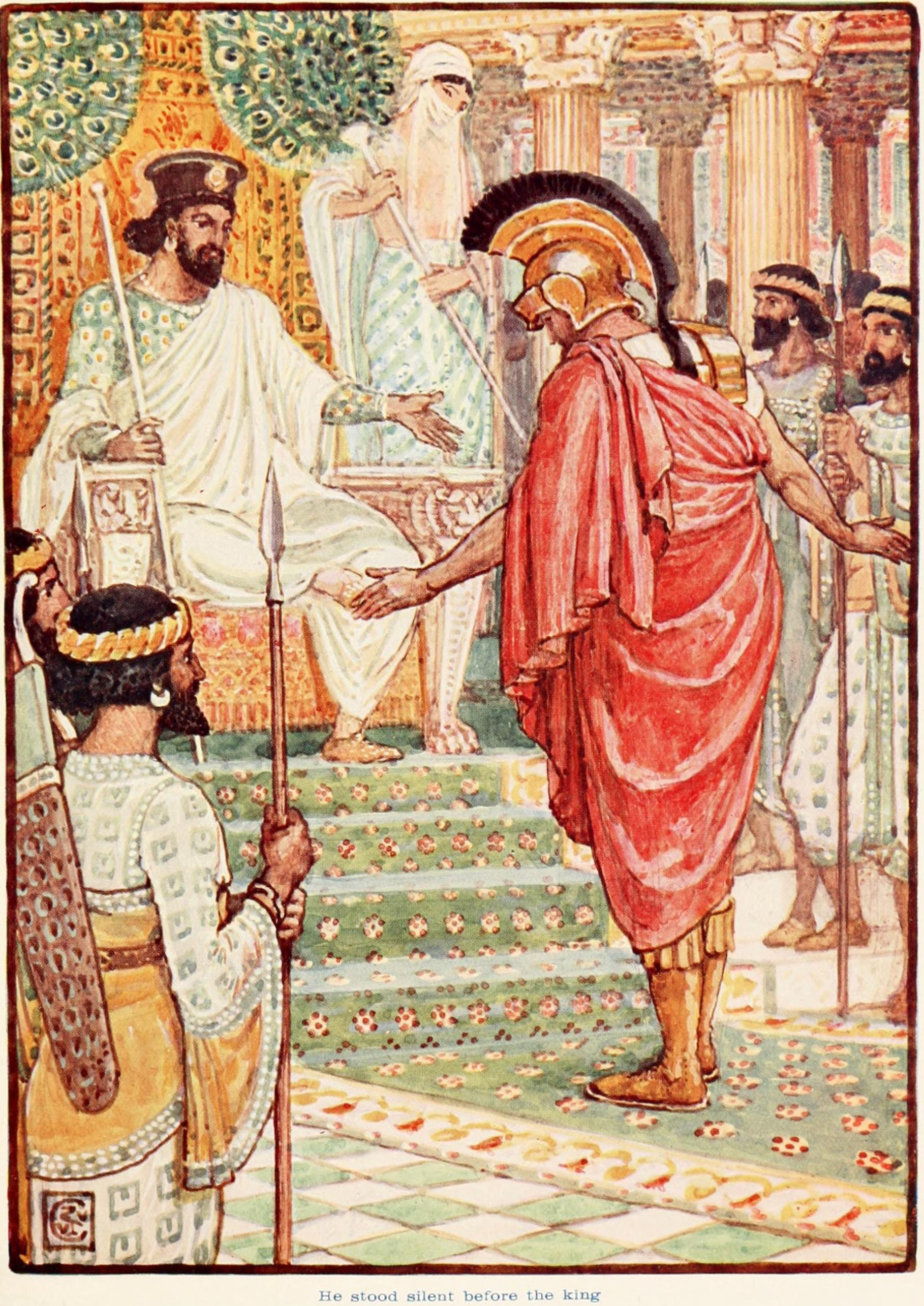
Illustration by Walter Crane showing Themistocles standing silently before King Artaxerxes

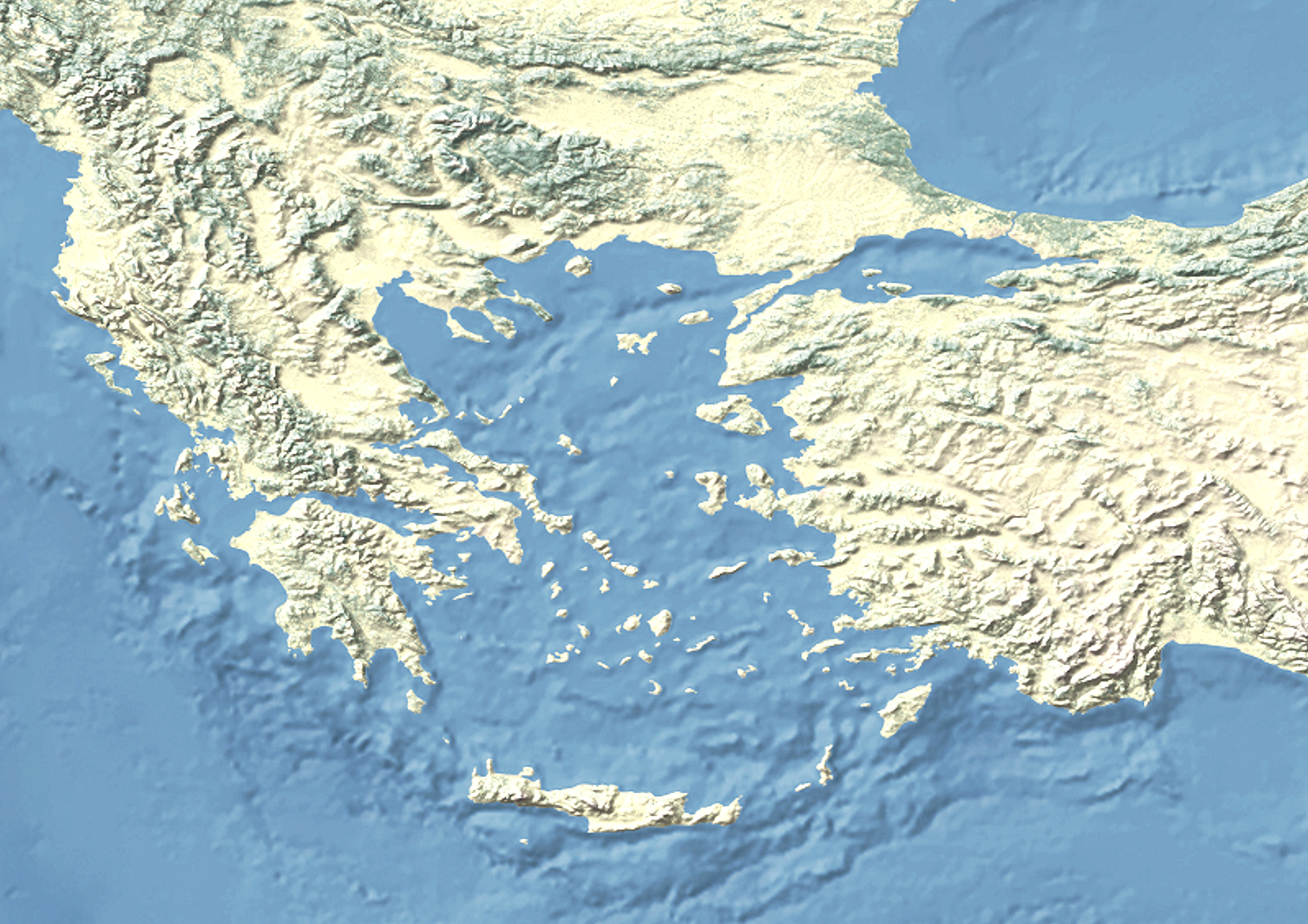
Location of Magnesia on the Meander, where Themistocles ruled as Governor under the Achaemenid Empire, as well as Lampsacus and Myus from which he also obtained his revenues.

From Molossia, Themistocles apparently fled to Pydna, from where he took a ship for Asia Minor. This ship was blown off course by a storm, and ended up at Naxos, which an Athenian fleet was in the process of besieging. Desperate to avoid the legal authorities, Themistocles, who had been traveling under an assumed identity, revealed himself to the captain and said that if he did not reach safety he would tell the Athenians that he'd bribed the ship to take him. According to Thucydides, who wrote within living memory of the events, the ship eventually landed safely at Ephesus, where Themistocles disembarked. Plutarch has the ship docking at Cyme in Aeolia, and Diodorus has Themistocles making his way to Asia in an undefined manner. Diodorus and Plutarch next recount a similar tale, namely that Themistocles stayed briefly with an acquaintance (Lysitheides or Nicogenes) who was also acquainted with the Persian king, Artaxerxes I. Since there was a bounty on Themistocles's head, this acquaintance devised a plan to safely convey Themistocles to the Persian king in the type of covered wagon that the King's concubines travelled in. All three chroniclers agree that Themistocles's next move was to contact the Persian king; in Thucydides, this is by letter, while Plutarch and Diodorus have a face-to-face meeting with the king. The spirit is, however, the same in all three: Themistocles introduces himself to the king and seeks to enter his service:

I, Themistocles, am come to you, who did your house more harm than any of the Hellenes, when I was compelled to defend myself against your father's invasion—harm, however, far surpassed by the good that I did him during his retreat, which brought no danger for me but much for him. (Thucydides)

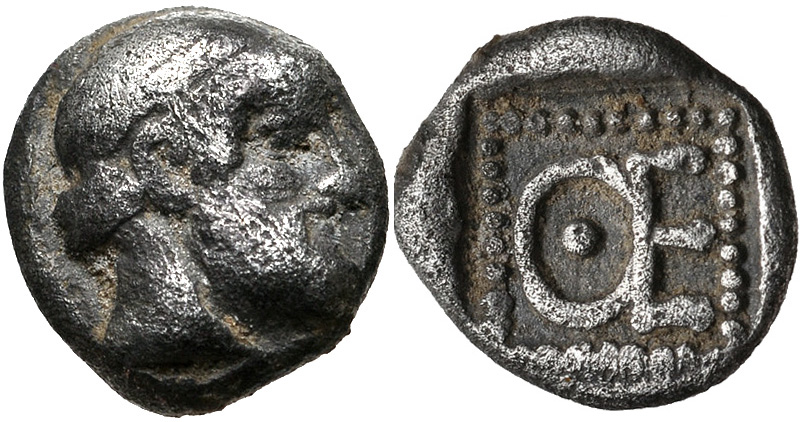
Coin of Themistocles as Governor of Magnesia. Obv: Head of Zeus. Rev: Letters ΘΕ, initials of Themistocles. c. 465 – 459 BC

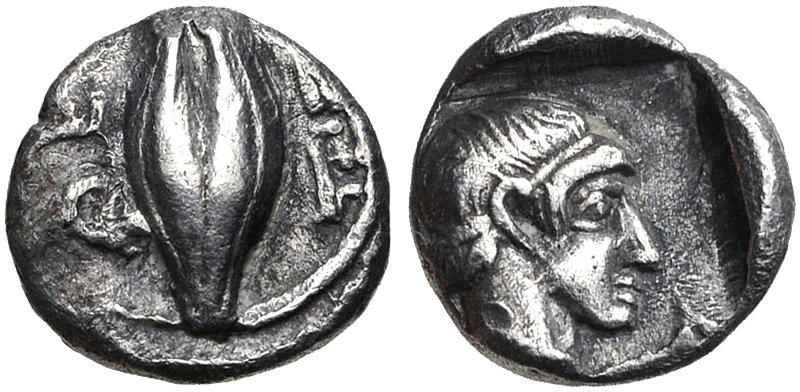
Coin of Themistocles as Governor of Magnesia. Obv: Barley grain. ΘE to left. Rev: Possible portrait of Themistocles. c. 465 – 459 BC.

Thucydides and Plutarch say that Themistocles asked for a year's grace to learn the Persian language and customs, after which he would serve the king, and Artaxerxes granted this. Plutarch reports that, as might be imagined, Artaxerxes was elated that such a dangerous and illustrious foe had come to serve him.

At some point in his travels, Themistocles's wife and children were extricated from Athens by a friend, and joined him in exile. His friends also managed to send him many of his belongings, although up to 100 talents worth of his goods were confiscated by the Athenians. When, after a year, Themistocles returned to the king's court, he appears to have made an immediate impact, and "he attained ... very high consideration there, such as no Hellene has ever possessed before or since". Plutarch recounts that "honors he enjoyed were far beyond those paid to other foreigners; nay, he actually took part in the King's hunts and in his household diversions". Themistocles advised the king on his dealings with the Greeks, although it seems that for a long period, the king was distracted by events elsewhere in the empire, and thus Themistocles "lived on for a long time without concern". He was made governor of the district of Magnesia on the Maeander River in Asia Minor, and assigned the revenues of three cities: Magnesia (about 50 talents per year—"for bread"); Myus ("for opson"); and Lampsacus ("for wine"). According to Plutarch, Neanthes of Cyzicus and Phanias reported two more, the city of Palaescepsis ("for clothes") and the city of Percote ("for bedding and furniture for his house"), both near Lampsacus.

=== Greek exiles in the Achaemenid Empire ===
Themistocles was one of the several Greek aristocrats who took refuge in the Achaemenid Empire following reversals at home, other famous ones being Hippias, Demaratos, Gongylos or later Alcibiades. In general, those were generously welcomed by the Achaemenid kings, received land grants to support them, and ruled over cities throughout Asia Minor. Conversely, some Achaemenid satraps were welcomed as exiles in western courts, such as Artabazos II.

=== First portraiture of a ruler on coinage ===
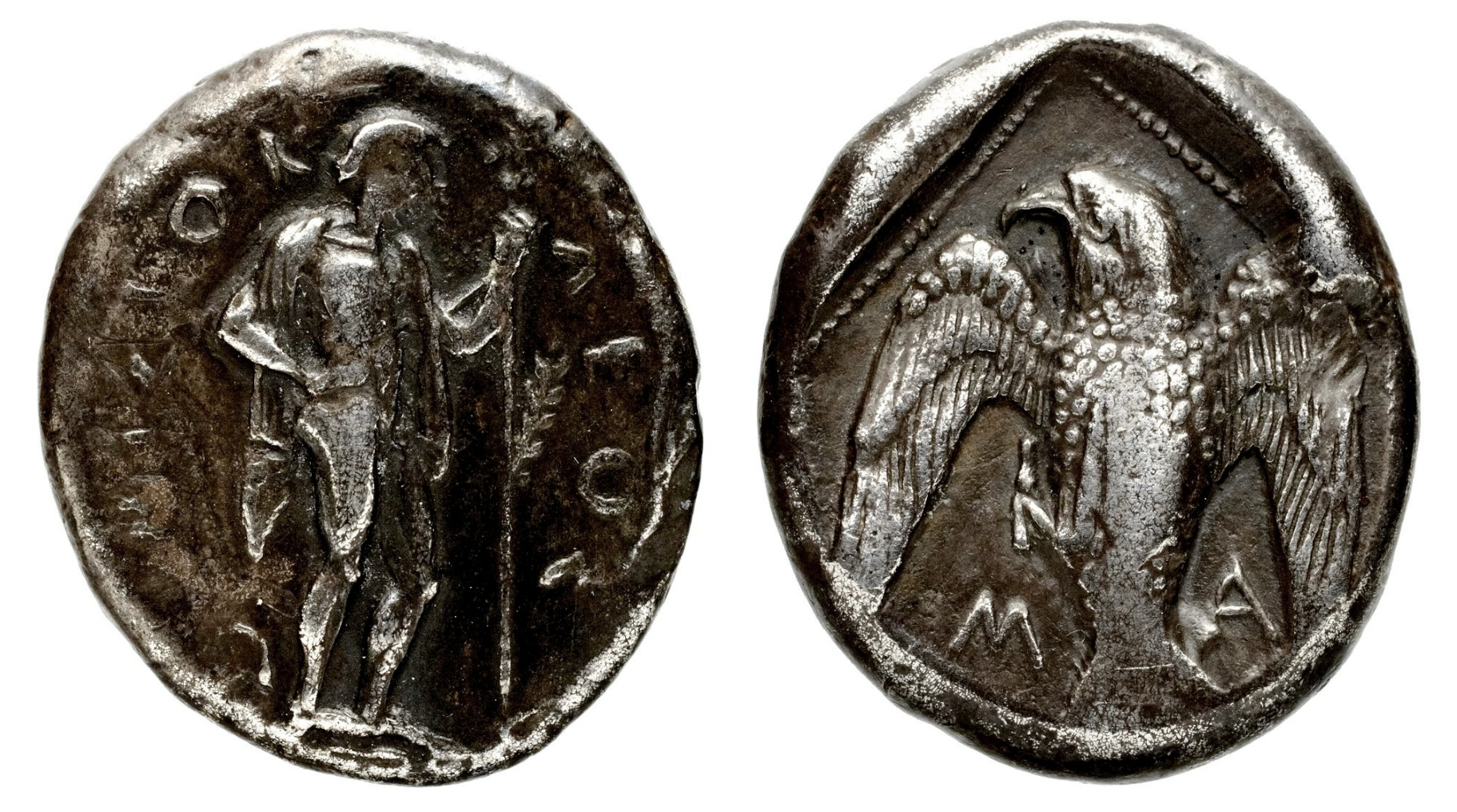
Didrachm of Themistocles in Magnesia. Obv: Apollo standing in clamys, legend around ΘΕΜΙΣΤΟΚ-ΛΕΟΣ ("Themistokles"). Rev: Eagle with letters Μ-Α ("Magnesia").

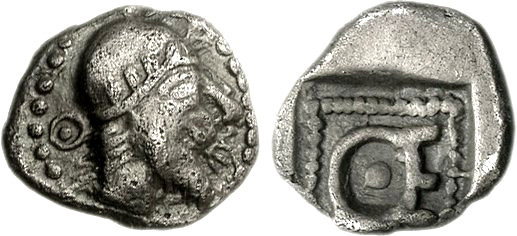
Hemiobol of Themistocles in Magnesia, where he is seen wearing a tight bonnet with Olive wreath (a similar headdress can be seen on the coinage of Kherei). This possibly reflects the bonnets of Achaemenid Satraps, such as seen in the Herakleia head. Initials Θ-Ε around portrait and on reverse. c. 465–459 BC

Coins are the only contemporary documents remaining from the time of Themistocles. Although many coins in antiquity illustrated the images of various gods or symbols, the first portraiture of actual rulers only appears in the 5th century BC. Themistocles was probably the first ruler ever to issue coinage with his personal portrait, as he became Achaemenid Governor of Magnesia in 465–459 BC. Themistocles may have been in a unique position in which he could transfer the notion of individual portraiture, already current in the Greek world, and at the same time wield the dynastic power of an Achaemenid dynast who could issue his own coins and illustrate them as he wished. Still, there is some doubt that his coins may have represented Zeus rather than himself.

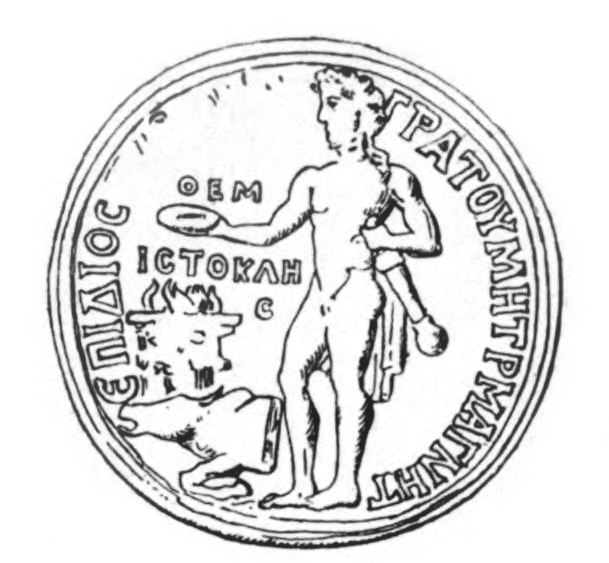
The statue which Themistocles erected to himself in Magnesia, on a coin of Antoninus Pius. The name of Themistocles (ΘΕΜ/ΙϹΤΟΚΛΗ/Ϲ) appears around the forearm of the statue. Themistocles is holding a patera over a lighted altar, with scabbard of sword in sheath at waist; at feet to left, forepart of humpbacked bull lying left.

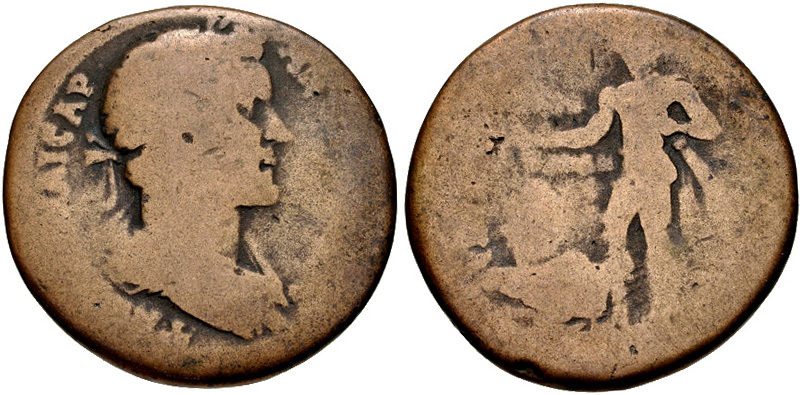
Type of the coin of Antoninus Pius minted in Magnesia, on which appears the statue of Themistocles (138–161 AD).

During his lifetime, Themistocles is known to have erected two statues to himself, one in Athens, and the other in Magnesia, which would lend credence to the possibility that he also illustrated himself on his coins. The Themistocles statue in Magnesia was illustrated on the reverse of some of the Magnesian coins of Roman Emperor Antoninus Pius in the 2nd century.

The rulers of Lycia followed towards the end of the 5th century as the most prolific and unambiguous producers of coins displaying the portrait of their rulers. From the time of Alexander the Great, portraiture of the issuing ruler would then become a standard, generalized, feature of coinage.

=== Death ===
Themistocles died at Magnesia in 459 BC aged 65, according to Thucydides, from natural causes. However, perhaps inevitably, there were also rumours surrounding his death, saying that unwilling to follow the Great King's order to make war on Athens, he committed suicide by taking poison, or drinking bull's blood. Plutarch provides the most evocative version of this story:

But when Egypt revolted with Athenian aid...and Cimon's mastery of the sea forced the King to resist the efforts of the Hellenes and to hinder their hostile growth...messages came down to Themistocles saying that the King commanded him to make good his promises by applying himself to the Hellenic problem; then, neither embittered by anything like anger against his former fellow-citizens, nor lifted up by the great honor and power he was to have in the war, but possibly thinking his task not even approachable, both because Hellas had other great generals at the time, and especially because Cimon was so marvelously successful in his campaigns; yet most of all out of regard for the reputation of his own achievements and the trophies of those early days; having decided that his best course was to put a fitting end to his life, he made a sacrifice to the gods, then called his friends together, gave them a farewell clasp of his hand, and, as the current story goes, drank bull's blood, or as some say, took a quick poison, and so died in Magnesia, in the sixty-fifth year of his life...They say that the King, on learning the cause and the manner of his death, admired the man yet more, and continued to treat his friends and kindred with kindness.

It was rumored that after his death, Themistocles's bones were transported to Attica in accordance with his wishes, and buried in his native soil in secret, it being illegal to bury an Athenian traitor in Attica. The Magnesians built a "splendid tomb" in their marketplace for Themistocles, which still stood during the time of Plutarch, and continued to dedicate part of their revenues to the family of Themistocles. Nepos in the 1st century BC wrote about a statue of Themistocles visible in the forum of Magnesia. The statue also appears on a coin type of Roman emperor Antoninus Pius minted in Magnesia in the 2nd century CE.

=== Succession and descendants ===
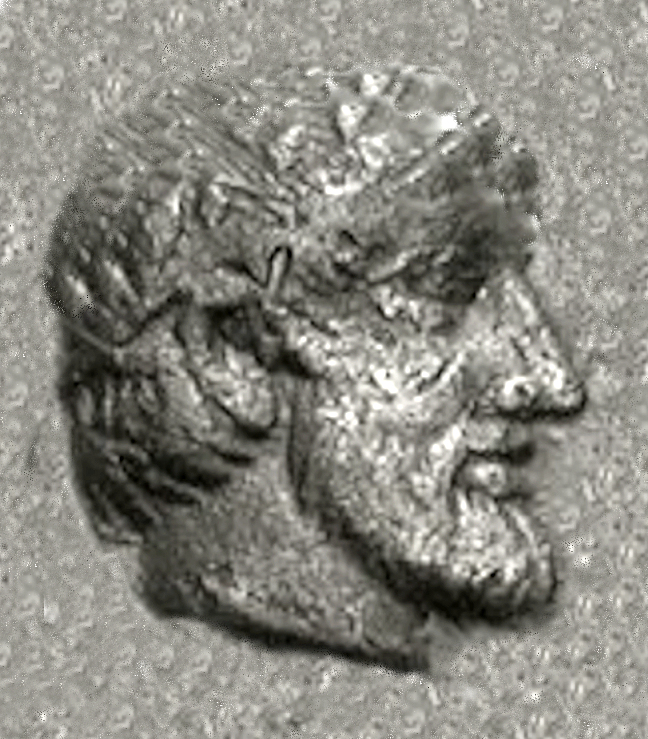
Portrait of a ruler with olive wreath on the Magnesian coinage of Archeptolis, son of Themistocles, c. 459 BC. The portraits on the coinage of Archeptolis could also represent Themistocles himself.

Archeptolis, son of Themistocles, became a Governor of Magnesia after his father's death c. 459 BCE. Archeptolis also minted his own silver coinage as he ruled Magnesia, and it is probable that part of his revenues continued to be handed over to the Achaemenids in exchange for the maintenance of their territorial grant. Themistocles and his son formed what some authors have called "a Greek dynasty in the Persian Empire".

From a second wife, Themistocles also had a daughter named Mnesiptolema, whom he appointed as priestess of the Temple of Dindymene in Magnesia, with the title of "Mother of the Gods". Mnesiptolema would eventually marry her half-brother Archeptolis, homopatric (but not homometric) marriages being permitted in Athens.

Themistocles also had several other daughters, named Nicomache, Asia, Italia, Sybaris, and probably Hellas, who married the Greek exile in Persia Gongylos and still had a fief in Persian Anatolia in 400/399 BC as his widow.

Themistocles also had three other sons, Diocles, Polyeucteus and Cleophantus, the latter possibly a ruler of Lampsacus. One of the descendants of Cleophantus still issued a decree in Lampsacus around 200 BC mentioning a feast for his own father, also named Themistocles, who had greatly benefited the city. Later, Pausanias wrote that the sons of Themistocles "appear to have returned to Athens", and that they dedicated a painting of Themistocles in the Parthenon and erected a bronze statue to Artemis Leucophryene, the goddess of Magnesia, on the Acropolis. They may have returned from Asia Minor in old age, after 412 BC, when the Achaemenids took again firm control of the Greek cities of Asia, and they may have been expelled by the Achaemenid satrap Tissaphernes sometime between 412 and 399 BC. In effect, from 414 BC, Darius II had started to resent increasing Athenian power in the Aegean and had Tissaphernes enter into an alliance with Sparta against Athens, which in 412 BC led to the Persian conquest of the greater part of Ionia.

Plutarch, in the 1st century AD, indicates that he met in Athens a lineal descendant of Themistocles (also called Themistocles) who was still being paid revenues from Asia Minor, 600 years after the events in question.

== Assessments ==
=== Character ===
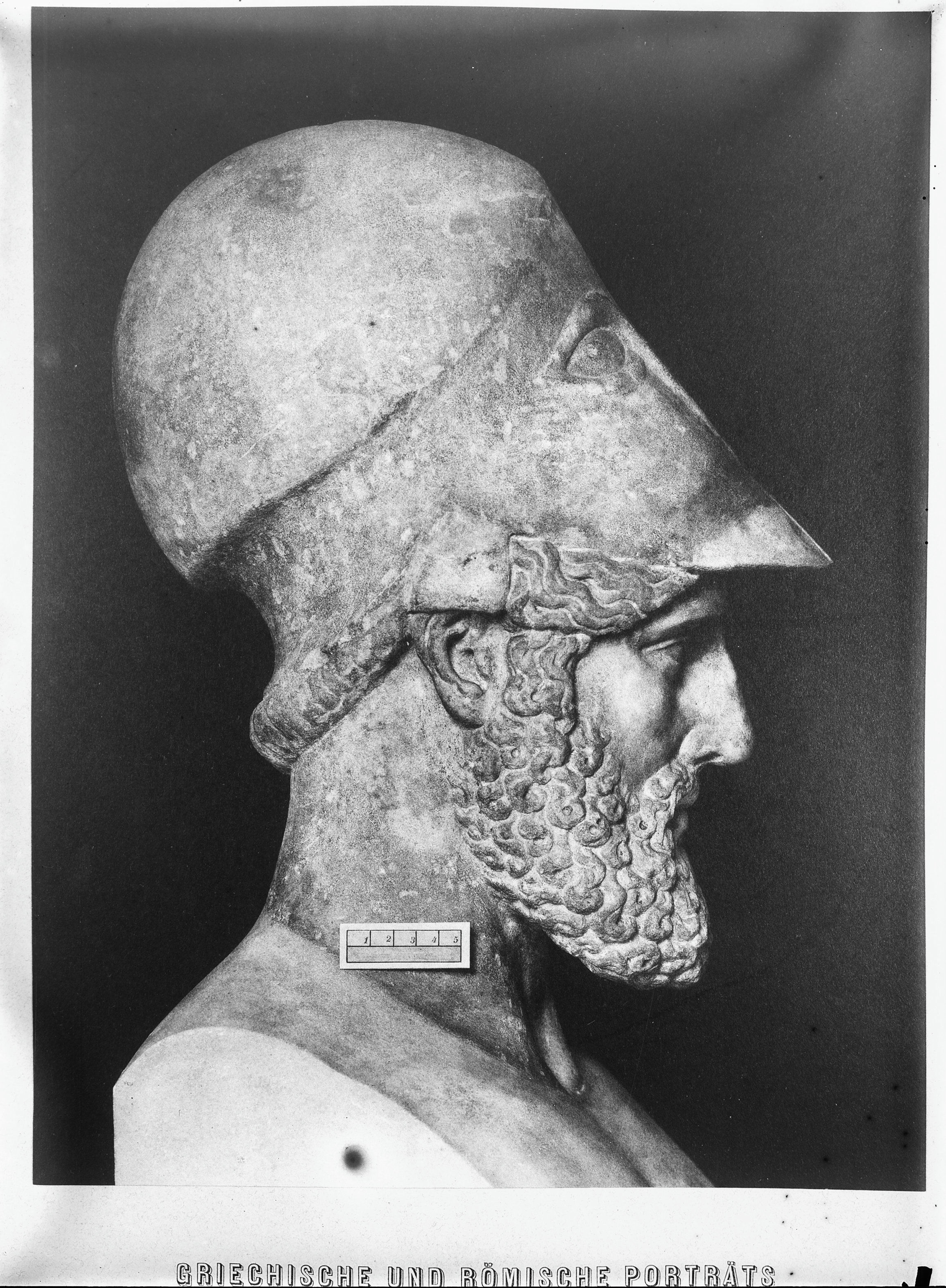
Bust of Themistocles

It is possible to draw some conclusions about Themistocles's character. Perhaps his most evident trait was his massive ambition; "In his ambition he surpassed all men"; "he hankered after public office rather as a man in delirium might crave a cure". He was proud and vain, and anxious for recognition of his deeds. His relationship with power was of a particularly personal nature; while he undoubtedly desired the best for Athens, many of his actions also seem to have been made in self-interest. He also appears to have been corrupt (at least by modern standards), and was known for his fondness of bribes.

Yet, set against these negative traits, was an apparently natural brilliance and talent for leadership:

Themistocles was a man who exhibited the most indubitable signs of genius; indeed, in this particular he has a claim on our admiration quite extraordinary and unparalleled. By his own native capacity, alike unformed and unsupplemented by study, he was at once the best judge in those sudden crises which admit of little or of no deliberation, and the best prophet of the future, even to its most distant possibilities. An able theoretical expositor of all that came within the sphere of his practice, he was not without the power of passing an adequate judgment in matters in which he had no experience. He could also excellently divine the good and evil which lay hid in the unseen future. In fine, whether we consider the extent of his natural powers, or the slightness of his application, this extraordinary man must be allowed to have surpassed all others in the faculty of intuitively meeting an emergency.

Both Herodotus and Plato record variations of an anecdote in which Themistocles responded with subtle sarcasm to an undistinguished man who complained that the great politician owed his fame merely to the fact that he came from Athens. As Herodotus tells it:

Timodemus of Aphidnae, who was one of Themistocles's enemies but not a man of note, was crazed with envy and spoke bitterly to Themistocles of his visit to Lacedaemon, saying that the honors he had from the Lacedaemonians were paid him for Athens' sake and not for his own. This he kept saying until Themistocles replied, 'This is the truth of the matter: if I had been a man of Belbina I would not have been honored in this way by the Spartans, nor would you, sir, for all you are a man of Athens.' Such was the end of that business.

As Plato tells it, the heckler hails from the small island of Seriphus; Themistocles retorts that it is true that he would not have been famous if he had come from that small island, but that the heckler would not have been famous either if he had been born in Athens.

Themistocles was undoubtedly intelligent, but also possessed natural cunning; "the workings of his mind [were] infinitely mobile and serpentine". Themistocles was evidently sociable and appears to have enjoyed strong personal loyalty from his friends. At any rate, it seems to have been Themistocles's particular mix of virtues and vices that made him such an effective politician.

=== Historical reputation ===
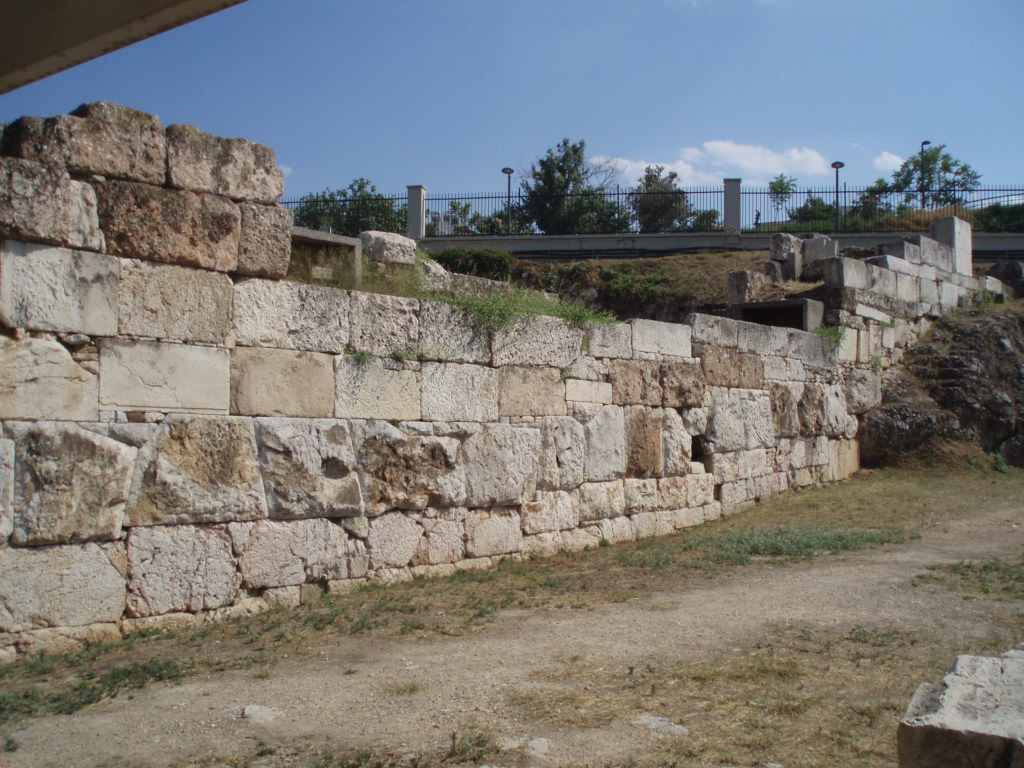
Ruins of the Themistoclean Wall in the Kerameikos of Athens, Greece, named after Themistocles

Themistocles died with his reputation in tatters, a traitor to the Athenian people; the "saviour of Greece" had turned into the enemy of liberty. However, his reputation in Athens was rehabilitated by Pericles in the 450s BC, and by the time Herodotus wrote his history, Themistocles was once again seen as a hero. Thucydides evidently held Themistocles in some esteem, and is uncharacteristically flattering in his praise for him (see above). Diodorus also extensively praises Themistocles, going as far as to offer a rationale for the length at which he discusses him: "Now on the subject of the high merits of Themistocles, even if we have dwelt over-long on the subject in this digression, we believed it not seemly that we should leave his great ability unrecorded." Indeed, Diodorus, whose history includes Alexander the Great and Hannibal, goes so far as to say that

But if any man, putting envy aside, will estimate closely not only the man's natural gifts but also his achievements, he will find that on both counts Themistocles holds first place among all of whom we have record. Therefore, one may well be amazed that the Athenians were willing to rid themselves of a man of such genius.

Plutarch offers a more nuanced view of Themistocles, with more of a critique of Themistocles's character. He does not detract from Themistocles's achievements, but also highlights his failings.

Napoleon compared himself to Themistocles after the Battle of Waterloo, in his surrender letter;

Royal Highness, – Exposed to the factions which divide my country, and to the enmity of the great Powers of Europe, I have terminated my political career; and I come, like Themistocles, to throw myself upon the hospitality (m'asseoir sur le foyer) of the British people. I claim from your Royal Highness the protections of the laws, and throw myself upon the most powerful, the most constant, and the most generous of my enemies.|Napoleon. (letter of surrender to the Prince Regent; translation).

== Political and military legacy ==
Map of the Athenian Empire in 431 BC

Undoubtedly the greatest achievement of Themistocles's career was his role in the defeat of Xerxes' invasion of Greece. Against overwhelming odds, Greece survived, and classical Greek culture, so influential in Western civilization, was able to develop unabated. Moreover, Themistocles's doctrine of Athenian naval power, and the establishment of Athens as a major power in the Greek world, were of enormous consequence during the 5th century BC. In 478 BC, the Hellenic alliance was reconstituted without the Peloponnesian states into the Delian League, in which Athens was the dominant power. This was essentially a maritime alliance of Athens and her colonies, the Aegean islands, and the Ionian cities. The Delian league took the war to Persia, eventually invading Persian territory and dominating the Aegean. Under Pericles' guidance, the Delian league evolved into the Athenian Empire, the zenith of Athenian power and influence. Themistocles seems to have deliberately set Athens up as a rival to Sparta in the aftermath of Xerxes' invasion, basing this strategy on Athenian naval power (contrasted with the power of the Spartan army). Tension grew throughout the century between Athens and Sparta, as they competed to be the leading state in Greece. Finally, in 431 BC, this tension erupted into the Peloponnesian War, the first of a series of conflicts that tore Greece apart for the next century.

Diodorus provides a rhetorical summary that reflects on Themistocles's achievements:

What other man, while Sparta still had the superior strength and the Spartan Eurybiades held the supreme command of the fleet, could by his single-handed efforts have deprived Sparta of that glory? Of what other man have we learned from history that by a single act he caused himself to surpass all the commanders, his city all the other Greek states, and the Greeks the barbarians? In whose term as general have the resources been more inferior and the dangers they faced greater? Who, facing the united might of all Asia, has found himself at the side of his city when its inhabitants had been driven from their homes, and still won the victory?

Modern scholars have endorsed this view, seeing Themistocles as a quintessential leader and strategist able to transform his city in pursuit of his naval doctrine.

The South American plant genus Themistoclesia (named by Johann Friedrich Klotzsch, 1851) is named in honour of Themistocles.

== In popular culture ==
- Temistocle (1718), opera by Nicola Porpora
- Temistocle (1772), opera by Johann Christian Bach based on the life of Themistocles
- Thémistocle (1785), opera by François-André Danican Philidor based on the life of Themistocles.
- In the movie The 300 Spartans (1962), Themistocles is portrayed by the actor Ralph Richardson.
- In the movie Lawrence of Arabia (1962), T. E. Lawrence (Peter O'Toole) quotes Francis Bacon's paraphrase of Themistocles: "I cannot fiddle, but I can make a great state from a little city."
- The film 300: Rise of an Empire (2014) largely centers around Themistocles's (Sullivan Stapleton) command of the Greek allied fleet against the second Persian invasion of Greece.
