= Ostiense Museum =

Ostiense Museum may refer to either of the following museums in Rome:

- Museo Archeologico Ostiense ('Archaeological Museum of Ostia')
- Museo della Via Ostiense ('Via Ostiense Museum') in the Porta San Paolo
