= Belbina (Argolis) =

Coordinates: 37°28′10″N 23°55′36″E

Belbina (Ancient Greek: Βέλβινα) was a town on a small island of the same name (now known as St. George). The island was very lofty and difficult to access, situated at the entrance of the Saronic Gulf, about 10 miles (16 km) from the promontory of Sunium. Although nearer to Attica than the Peloponnesus, it was reckoned to belong to the latter, in particular to ancient Argolis. Therefore, it was inhabited by the Dorians, and was probably a colony from Belemina (also written Belmina and Belbina), a town on the confines of Laconia and Arcadia. Themistocles quotes the island as one of the most insignificant spots in ancient Greece. Although the island is now uninhabited, it was inhabited in antiquity. On the slopes of its hills there are traces of the ancient terraces, and on one of the summits are remains of the ancient town.
