= Archeptolis =

5th-century BC governor of Magnesia on the Maeander

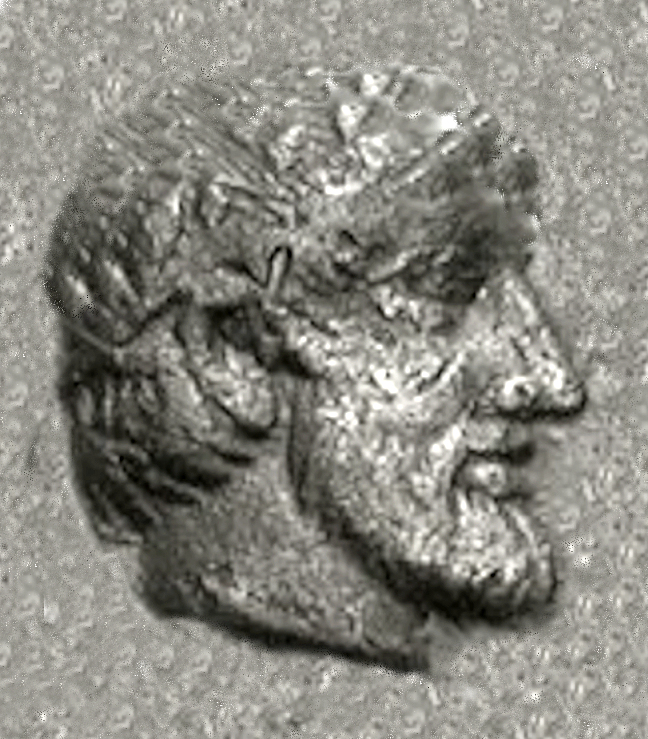
- Portrait of god with olive wreath, Archeptolis coinage.
- Military career
- Allegiance: Achaemenid Empire
- Service years: circa 459 BCE to possibly around 412 BCE.
- Rank: Governor of Magnesia on the Maeander

Location of Magnesia on the Meander, where Archeptolis ruled.

Archeptolis (Ancient Greek: Ἀρχέπτολις), also Archepolis, was a Governor of Magnesia on the Maeander in Ionia for the Achaemenid Empire circa 459 BCE to possibly around 412 BCE, and a son and successor of the former Athenian general Themistocles.

== Governor of Magnesia ==
Archeptolis minted silver coinage as he ruled Magnesia, just as his father had done, and it is probable that part of his revenues were handed over to the Achaemenids in exchange for the maintenance of their territorial grant.

Archeptolis is said to have married his half-sister Mnesiptolema (daughter of Themistocles from his second wife), homopatric (but not homometric) marriages being permitted in Athens.

Themistocles and his son formed what some authors have called "a Greek dynasty in the Persian Empire".

Archeptolis had several sisters, named Nicomache, Asia, Italia, Sybaris, and probably Hellas, who married the Greek exile in Persia Gongylos and still had a fief in Persian Anatolia in 399/400 BC as his widow. He also had three brothers, Diocles, Polyeucteus and Cleophantus, the latter possibly a ruler of Lampsacus. One of the descendants of Cleophantus still issued a decree in Lampsacus around 200 BC mentioning a feast for his father, also named Themistocles, who had greatly benefited the city.

Later, Pausanias wrote that the sons of Themistocles "appear to have returned to Athens", and that they dedicated a painting of Themistocles in the Parthenon and erected a bronze statue to Artemis Leucophryene, the goddess of Magnesia, on the Acropolis:

The children of Themistocles certainly returned and set up in the Parthenon a painting, on which is a portrait of Themistocles.

— Pausanias 1.1.2

They may have returned from Asia Minor in old age, after 412 BC, when the Achaemenids took again firm control of the Greek cities of Asia, and they may have been expelled by the Achaemenid satrap Tissaphernes sometime between 412 and 399 BC. In effect, from 414 BC, Darius II had started to resent increasing Athenian power in the Aegean and had Tissaphernes enter into an alliance with Sparta against Athens, which in 412 BC led to the Persian conquest of the greater part of Ionia.

== Coinage ==
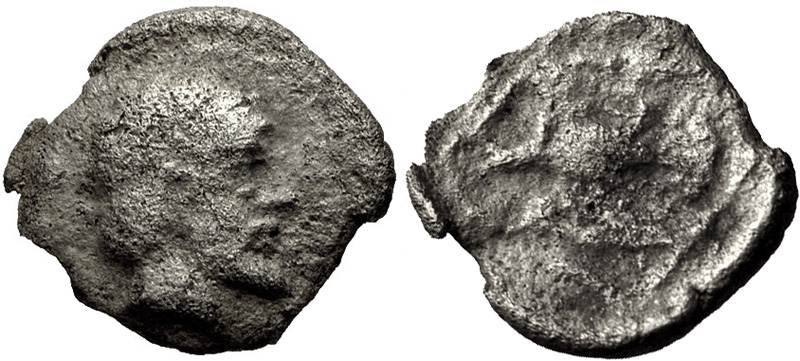
Coin of Governor of Magnesia Archeptolis, son of Themistocles, circa 459 BC. This coin type is similar to the coins issued by Themistocles himself as Governor of Magnesia. The obverse design could be a portrait of Themistocles.

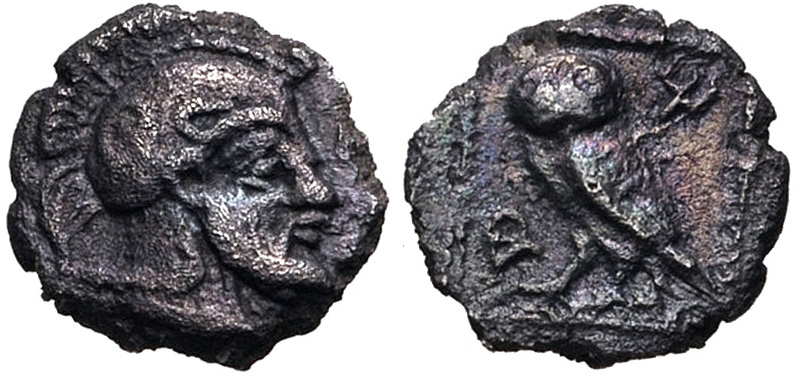
Coin of Archeptolis. Helmeted male and Athenian owl. Circa 459 BC

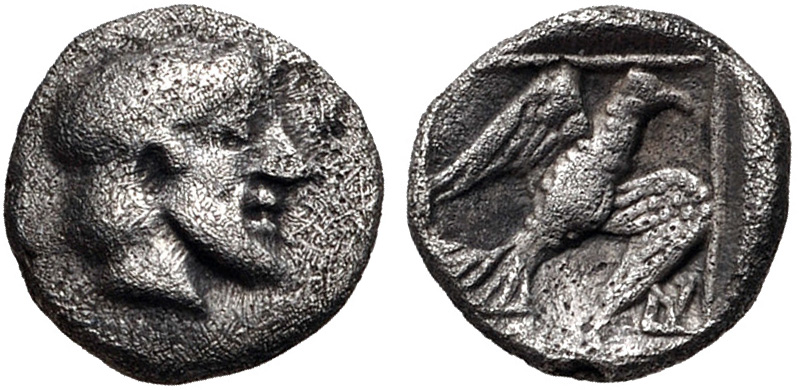
Coin of Archeptolis. Portrait (Zeus?) and eagle. Circa 459 BC

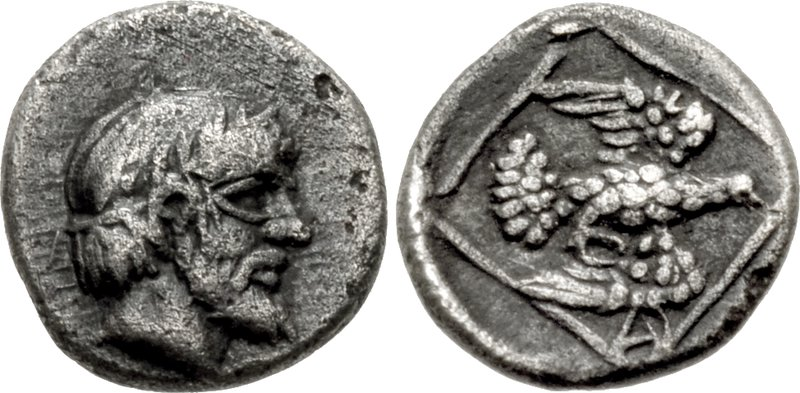
Coin of Archeptolis. Diademed head and eagle. Circa 459 BC

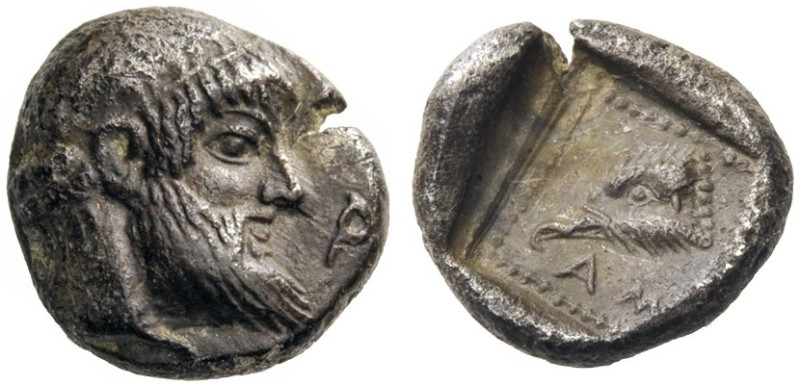
Coin of Governor of Magnesia Archeptolis, son of Themistocles, circa 459 BC.

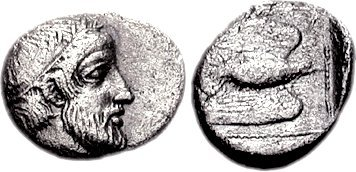
Archepolis coin Circa 459 BC.jpg

== See also ==
- Coins
