= Phrearrhii =

Coordinates: 37°46′39″N 23°57′33″E

Phrearrhii or Phrearrhioi or Phrearroi (Greek: Φρεάρριοι) was a deme of the coastal (paralia) region of ancient Attica, belonging to the Leontis tribe (phyle), with nine to ten representatives in the Boule.

It was situated roughly 30 km (20 mi) south-east of Athens, bordering the deme of Anaphlystos to the south-west, just north of Attic Olympus, close to modern Pheriza (Φέριζα), in the Lavreotiki municipality.

The Athenian statesman Themistocles was a native of Phrearrhioi.

Its site is located east of modern Olymbos.
