= Aristobule =

Ancient Greek mythological epithet

Aristobule (Ancient Greek: Ἀριστοβύλη) was an epithet of the Greek goddess Artemis, meaning "the best advisor", under which she was worshipped at Athens in ancient Greece.

The politician and general Themistocles built a temple of Artemis Aristobule at Athens, near his house in the deme of Melite, in which he dedicated his own statue. This annoyed a great many Greeks, who took this as Themistocles boasting of his own good counsel as a politician. Not long after this, Themistocles was ostracized and went into exile.

Some scholars contend that "Aristobule" should not be globally conflated with Artemis, and outside Athens was a distinct divine concept in its own right. The philosopher Porphyry spoke of Aristobule as one known by this name alone (as opposed to a more surname-like epithet, "Artemis Aristobule"). Scholar Noel Robertson proposed that in Rhodes "Aristoboule" ought to be identified with the Roman Mother goddess, also known as Cybele.

It has also been suggested by religion scholar Hermann Usener that "Aristobule" was a euphemism for capital punishment, and that this epithet and its temple had something to do with public executions, though other scholars disagree with this interpretation. This largely comes from speculation around the fact that in Athens the temple of Artemis Aristobule was very near to the place where the bodies of executed criminals who were denied interment (which was the ultimate punishment) were thrown into an open pit to rot.
