= Agios Georgios (island) =

Uninhabited island in the Saronic Gulf, Greece

Native name: Άγιος Γεώργιος
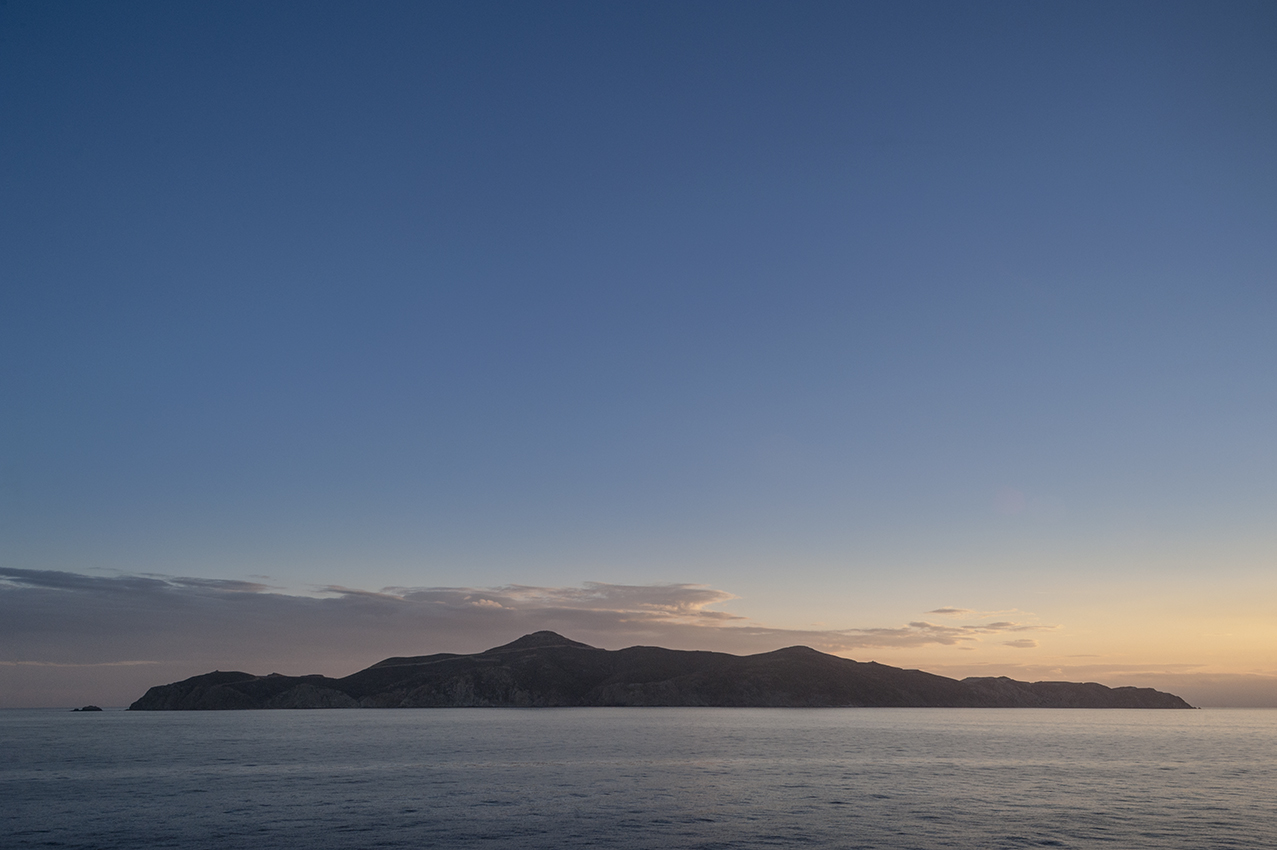
- Agios Georgios
- Interactive map of Agios Georgios

Geography
- Coordinates: 37°28′26″N 23°55′34″E
- Archipelago: Saronic Islands
- Area: 4.3 km^{2} (1.7 sq mi)

Administration
- Greece
- Region: Attica
- Regional unit: Islands
- Municipality: Hydra

Demographics
- Population: 0 (2021)

Agios Georgios (Greek: Άγιος Γεώργιος) or San Tzortzis is a Greek uninhabited island in the entry of Saronic Gulf. It is the largest uninhabited island of the Saronic Islands with an area of 4.3 km^{2}. Administratively, it is part of the municipality of Hydra.

== History ==
In antiquity the island was named Belbina (Ancient Greek: Βέλβινα) and is mentioned by Herodotus in a dialogue between Themistocles and his political opponent Timodemos from Afidnes. There was also a town of the same name on the island. Though some scholars have proposed that Agios Georgios should be identified as the ancient Psyttaleia which was involved in the Battle of Salamis, the consensus remains with the island that has long been known as Lipsokoutali, now renamed Psyttaleia.

== Modern times ==
In 2014 a 73 MW wind farm was built on the island by Terna Energy. It delivers about 250 GWh electricity per year to Athens. Administratively, the island has belonged to the municipality of Hydra since 1834. In recent years, the municipality of Lavreotiki challenged the ownership of the island (and its associated wind farm revenues), however a 2017 legal judgement reaffirmed Hydra's ownership.
