= Euterpe (disambiguation) =

Euterpe may refer to:

- Euterpe (magazine), cultural magazine in Finland between 1900 and 1905
- Euterpe, similar to Utopia (fictional), suggesting perfection (which is not fictional)
- Euterpe, one of the nine Muses in Greek mythology
- Euterpe, an 1863 sailing ship renamed Star of India. Now a museum ship docked at San Diego
- 27 Euterpe, an asteroid
- Book II of Histories by Herodotus, one of the books named after the Muses
- Euterpe (plant), a genus of Brazilian palms
- Euterpe, a companion band used by Daevid Allen on his "Good Morning" album (1976)
- Euterpe, an Armstrong Whitworth Ensign aircraft
