= Olive wreath =

Prize at the ancient Olympic Games

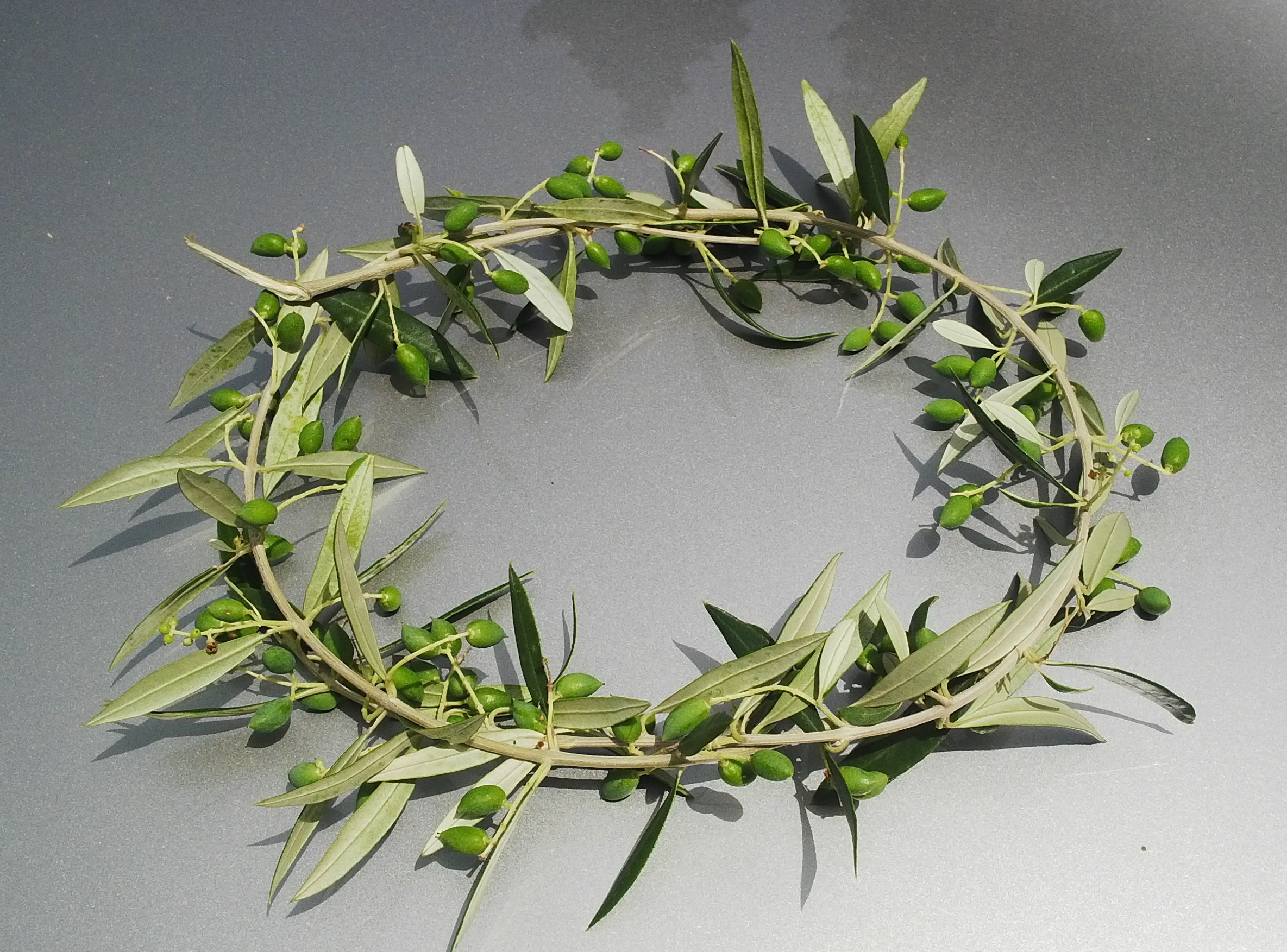
Kotinos, the prize for the winner at the Ancient Olympic Games.

The olive wreath, also known as kotinos (Greek: κότινος), was the prize for the winner at the ancient Olympic Games. It was a branch of the wild olive tree Elaia Kallistephanos that grew at Olympia, entwined to form a circle or a horse-shoe. The branches of the sacred wild-olive tree near the temple of Zeus were cut by a pais amphithales (Ancient Greek: παῖς ἀμφιθαλής, a boy whose parents were both alive) with a pair of golden scissors. Then he took them to the temple of Hera and placed them on a gold-ivory table. From there, the Hellanodikai (the judges of the Olympic Games) would take them, make the wreaths and crown the winners of the Games.

== History ==
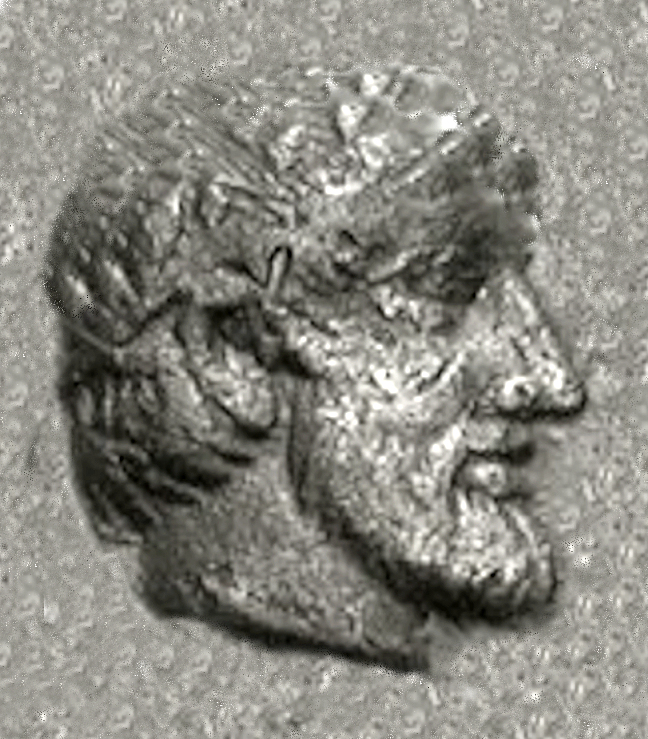
Archeptolis wearing an olive wreath, circa 459 BC.

According to Pausanias it was introduced by Heracles as a prize for the running race winner to honor his father Zeus. In the ancient Olympic Games there were no gold, silver, or bronze medals. There was only one winner per event, crowned with an olive wreath made of wild-olive leaves from a sacred tree near the temple of Zeus at Olympia. Olive wreaths were part of the iconography of the founding of the modern Olympic games, with imagery that has the wreath connecting the ancient practice and dates with the events in 1896. Olive wreaths were given out during the 2004 Summer Olympics in Athens in honor of the ancient tradition, because the games were being held in Greece which was also used as the official emblem.

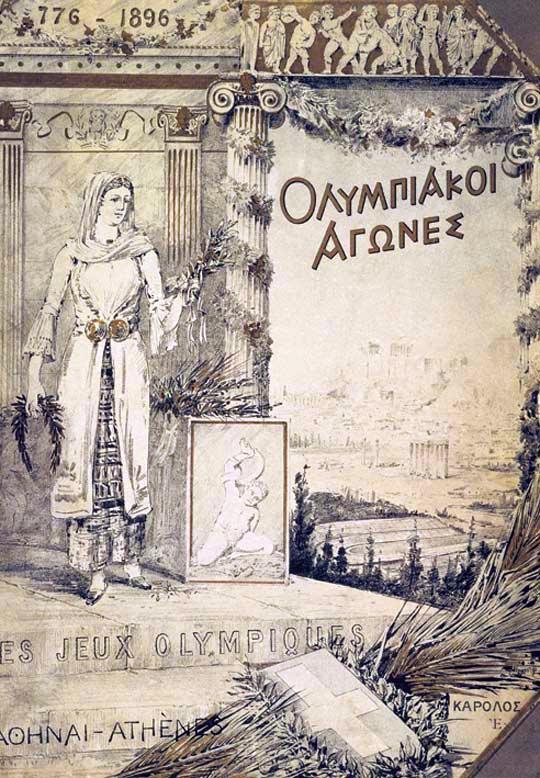
Program cover for the 1896 Olympics, with olive wreath imagery to connect to the ancient Olympics.

Herodotus describes the following story which is relevant to the olive wreath. Xerxes was interrogating some Arcadians after the Battle of Thermopylae. He inquired why there were so few Greek men defending the Thermopylae. The answer was "All other men are participating in the Olympic Games". And when asked "What is the prize for the winner?", "An olive-wreath" came the answer. Then Tiritantaechmes, one of his generals uttered: "Good heavens! Mardonius, what kind of men are these against whom you have brought us to fight? Men who do not compete for possessions, but for virtue."

Aristophanes in Plutus makes a humorous comment on victorious athletes who are crowned with wreath made of wild olive instead of gold:

Why, Zeus is poor, and I will clearly prove it to you. In the Olympic games, which he founded, and to which he convokes the whole of Greece every four years, why does he only crown the victorious athletes with wild olive? If he were rich he would give them gold.

The victorious athletes were honoured, feted, and praised. Their deeds were heralded and chronicled so that future generations could appreciate their accomplishments. In fact, the names of the Olympic winners formed the chronology basis of the ancient world, as arranged by Timaeus in his work, The Histories.

Amongst the many cultural references concerning the olive wreath, the first line of the first stanza in the Mexican national anthem calls for the motherland, figuratively, to keep hold of the olive wreath surrounding "its temples", a wreath which was given by a holy archangel, for God himself has already written this motherland's destiny.

== See also ==
- Olympic medal
- Ancient Olympic Games
- Olive branch
- Laurel wreath
- Klila, myrtle wreath in Mandaeism
- Wreaths and crowns in antiquity
