= Museo Archeologico Ostiense =

Museum in Rome, Italy

Archaeological Museum of Ostia
- Museo Archeologico Ostiense
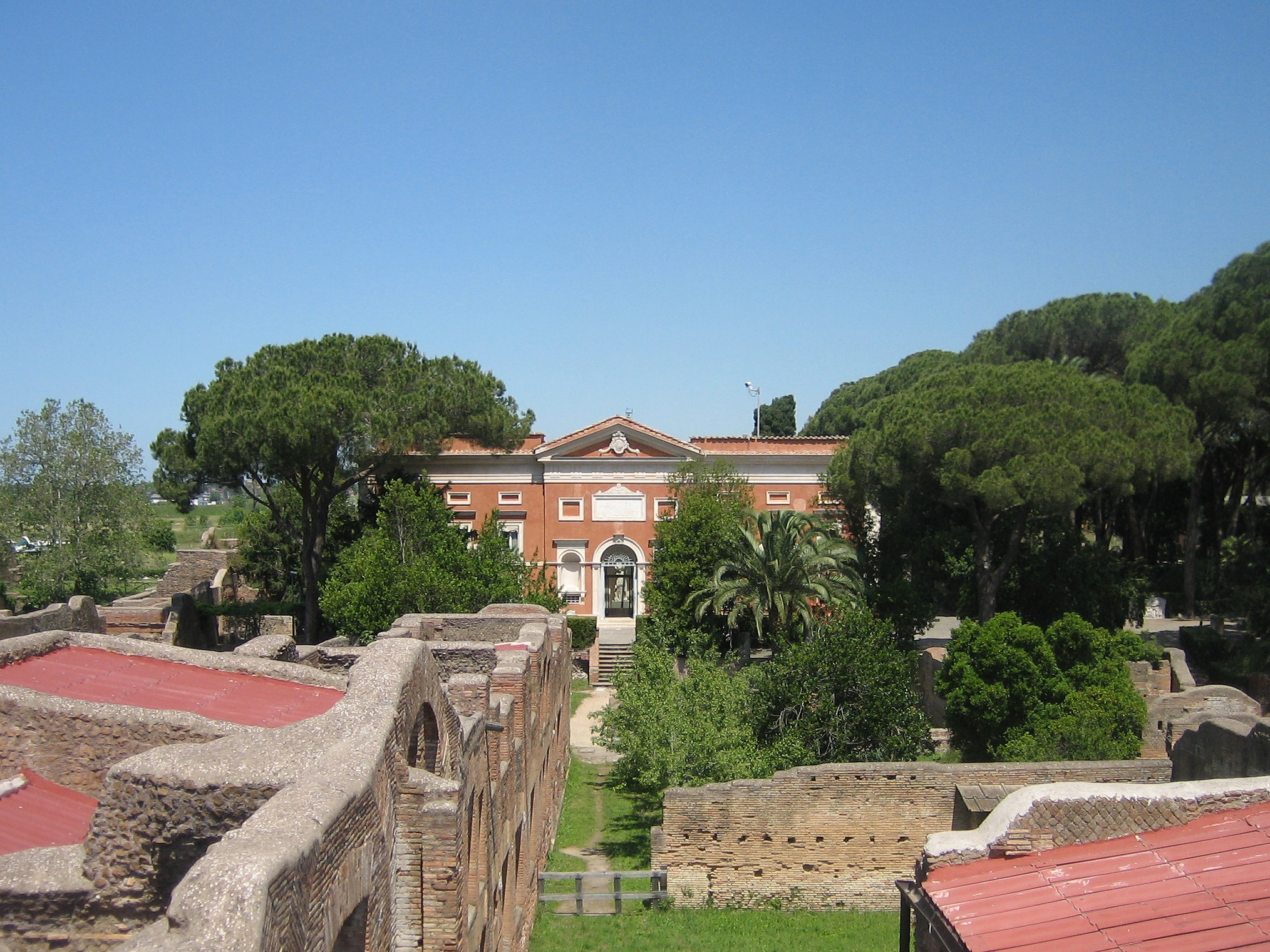
- Archaeological Museum of Ostia
- Click on the map for a fullscreen view
- Location: Viale dei Romagnoli, 717 Ostia, Italy
- Coordinates: 41°45′20″N 12°17′16″E
- Type: archaeology

The Museo Archeologico Ostiense ('Archaeological Museum of Ostia') is an archaeological museum dedicated to the ancient Roman city of Ostia in Rome, Italy.

The museum was built by Pope Pius IX, who in 1865 had to readapt a fifteenth-century building used as a store to create a city museum. Contained in the museum are numerous archaeological objects which came to light during a long period of excavations. The collection includes, for example, a collection of portraits of famous people from ancient Ostia, including philosophers and members of the royal family, such as busts depicting Asclepius and Volcacius Myropnous, a portrait of Faustina the Elder and the head of Trajan. The museum also has a large collection of sculptures, including the statue of Perseus holding the head of Medusa, the sculptural group of Mithras slaying the bull, and other works. There are other examples on display of great interest, such as small groups in marble depicting Cupid and Psyche and other subjects, and in another section of the museum, sarcophagi and reliefs. On display are also examples of wall paintings from different burials and emblems of polychrome mosaics, such as the Christ Blessing. These works of great historical and artistic value, are then supported by a collection of minor works such as crafts, glass, and even teaches some at the shop, and some interesting facts, such as the marble slab found in the temple of Bellona, on which are carved two pairs of feet opposite, probably a votive object.

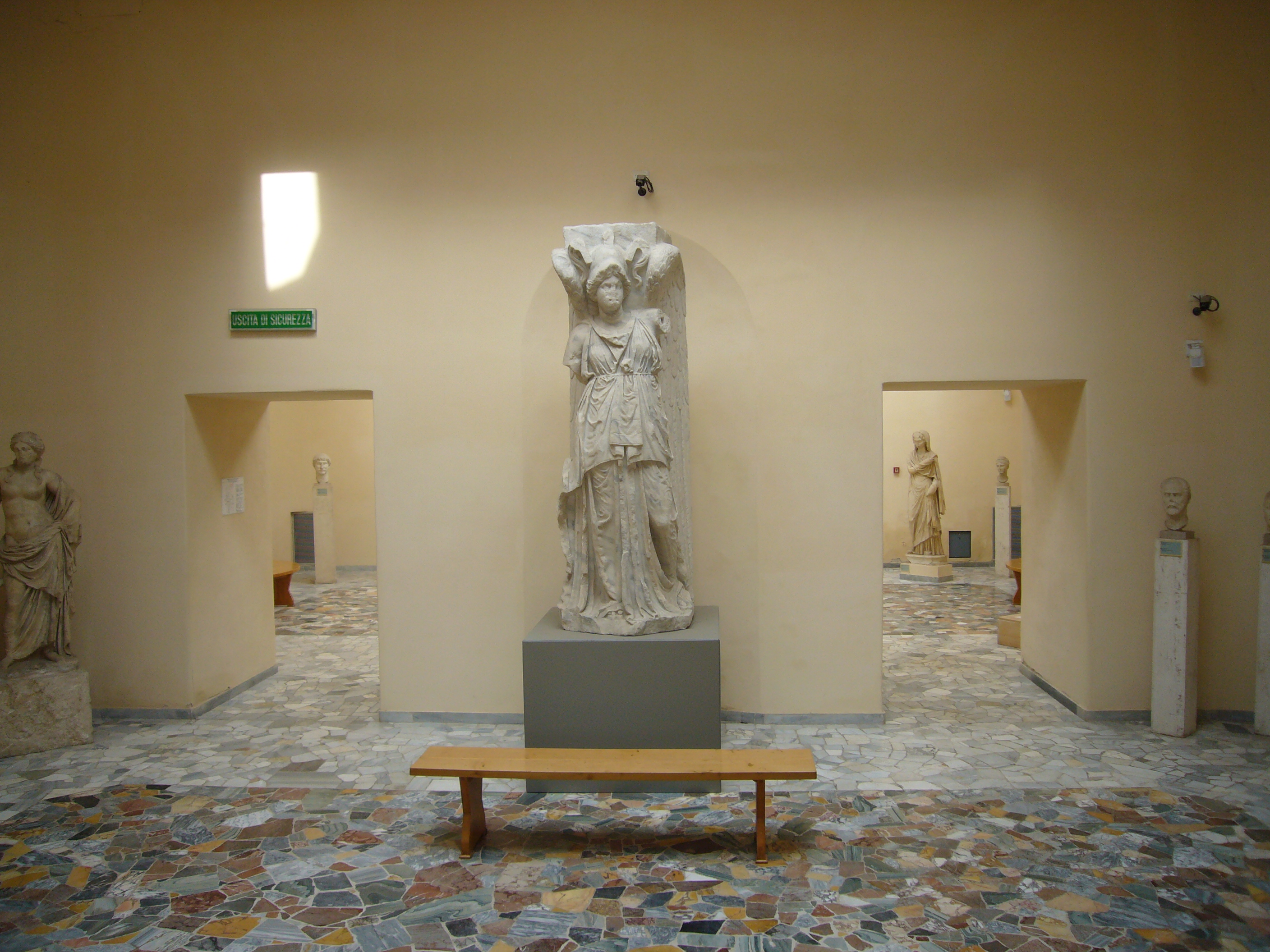
Roman copy of a winged goddess from the Temple of Jupiter in Ostia Antica

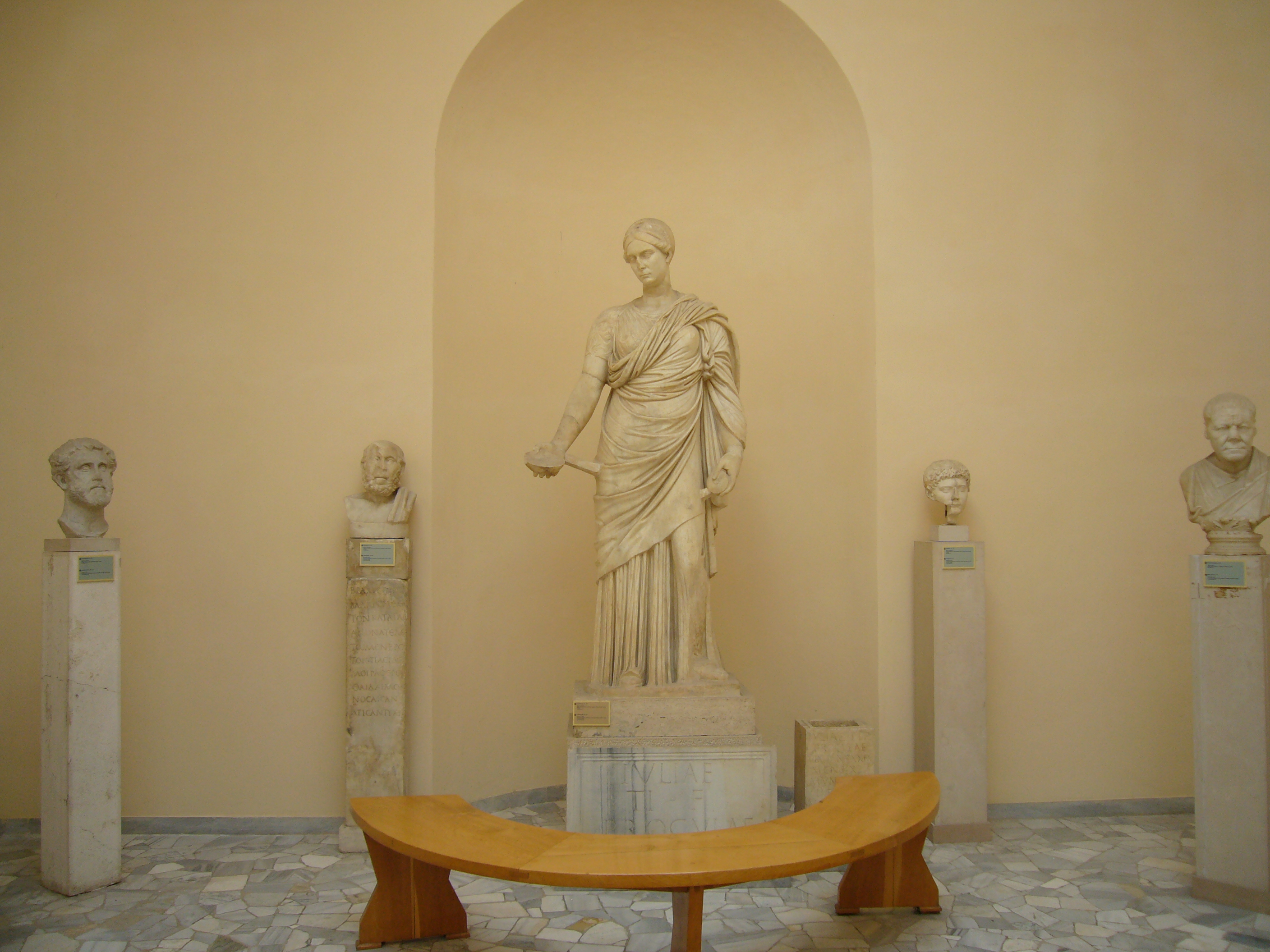
A female statue and male busts in the Archaeological Museum of Ostia

== See also ==
- Ostia Antica

Preceded by MAXXI	Landmarks of Rome; Museo Archeologico Ostiense	Succeeded by Museo Barracco di Scultura Antica
