= Echetlus (mythology) =

Figure from Greek mythology

In Greek mythology, the name Echetlus or Echetlos (Ancient Greek: Ἔχετλος, romanized: Échetlos or Ekhetlos, lit. 'he of the plough-tail' or 'the hero with the ploughshare') may refer to:

- Echetlus, an ancient Athenian mythical hero of the Battle of Marathon.
- Echetlus, one of the defenders of Thebes in the war of the Seven against Thebes. He was stabbed to death in the back by a certain Tagus while he was sleeping drunk among other Thebans surrounding the Argive camp after the death of the seer Amphiaraus, one of the leaders of the attackers.
