= Callimachus (disambiguation) =

Callimachus (Ancient Greek: Καλλίμαχος) may refer to:

== People ==
- Callimachus (polemarch), one of the commanders of the Athenian army at the Battle of Marathon in 490 BC
- Callimachus (sculptor) (5th century BC)
- Callimachus, 3rd century BC poet and scholar
- Callimachus (strategos), Ptolemaic official of the 1st century BC
- Filippo Buonaccorsi (1437–1496), called "Callimachus," Italian humanist

== Literature ==
- Callimachus (play), a 10th-century play by Hrotsvitha

== See also ==
- Callimachi family
