= Echetlus =

Ancient Greek mythical hero of the battle of Marathon

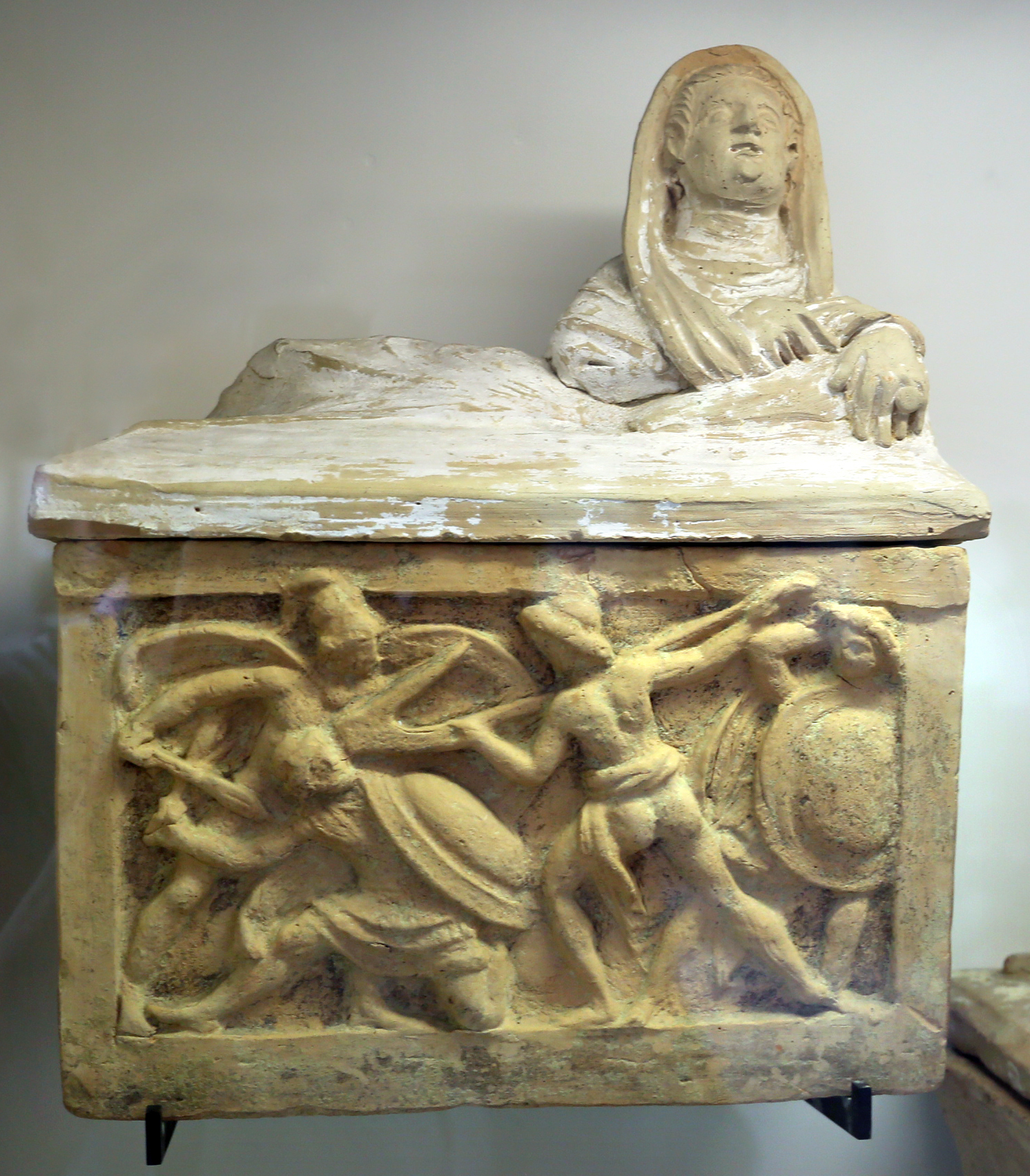
Echetlus fighting with the plow on an Etruscan funerary urn

Echetlaeus (Ancient Greek: Ἐχετλαῖος, romanized: Ekhetlaîos) or Echetlus (Ancient Greek: Ἔχετλος, romanized: Échetlos or Ekhetlos, lit. 'he of the plough-tail' or 'the hero with the ploughshare') was an ancient Athenian mythical hero of the Battle of Marathon with the Persians of the Achaemenid Empire.

== The hero of the Athenians ==
Echetlus emerged in the narrative tradition current in ancient Athens after the Battle of Marathon. His description was similar to Bouzyges, who is often depicted bearded, nude and holding a plough and a cattle prod. Some scholars note the close connection of these two with agriculture. Bouzyges was the hero considered the founder of agriculture and his name meant "yoker of oxen" while Echetlus' meant "he of the plough-handle".

In the battle's account, a man, who resembled a rustic, appeared among the Athenians during the battle and slew many of the Persians with his plough. After the battle, he disappeared. When the Athenians searched for him, they could not find him anywhere. When they consulted the oracle, they were commanded to worship the hero Echetlaeus, that is the hero with the echetlon, or ploughshare. It was believed that he was part of the gods' intervention during the conflict, which also included the appearances of divine personages such as Athena and Herakles in the battlefield.

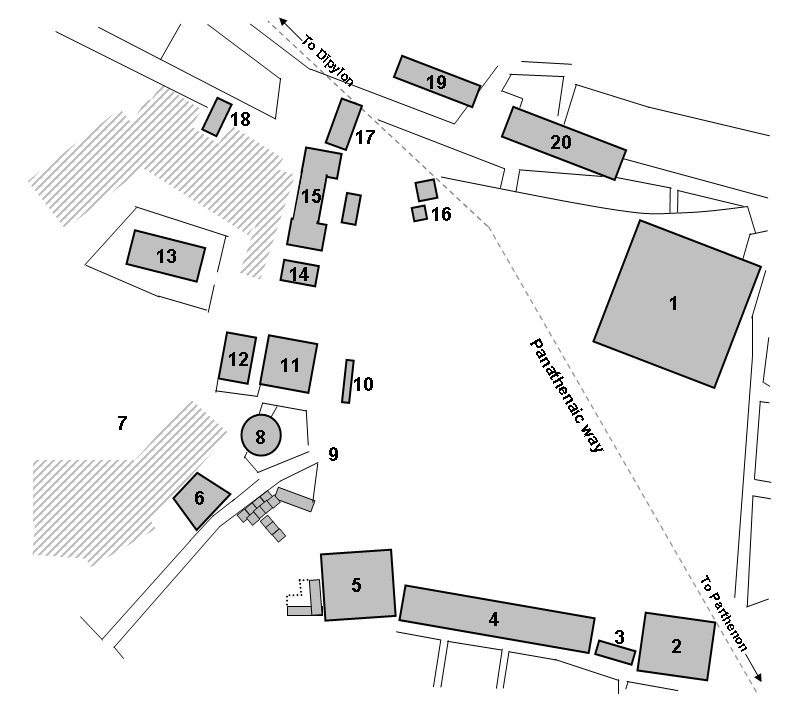
Plan showing the major buildings of the Agora; the Stoa Poikile is number 20

This Echetlus was depicted in the painting which represented the Battle of Marathon in the Stoa Poikile (Painted Porch), erected during the 5th century BC and located in the Ancient Agora of Athens. The hero was clearly distinguishable in this painting among the combatants in the same manner other heroes who fought at Marathon such as Callimachus, the polemarch of Athens, and Miltiades were depicted. Echetlus' mythical status in the eyes of the Athenians can be demonstrated by his inclusion in this painting, which also included Athena, Heracles, and the Attic heroes such as Theseus. The Stoa Poikile was one of the most famous sites in ancient Athens, due to its display of war-related paintings and loot.

== General and cited references ==
Attribution
