= Plowshare =

Pointy front edge of a plow

Components of a simple drawn plow: 1. beam; 2. three point hitch; 3. height regulator; 4. coulter or knife; 5. chisel; 6. plowshare; 7. moldboard

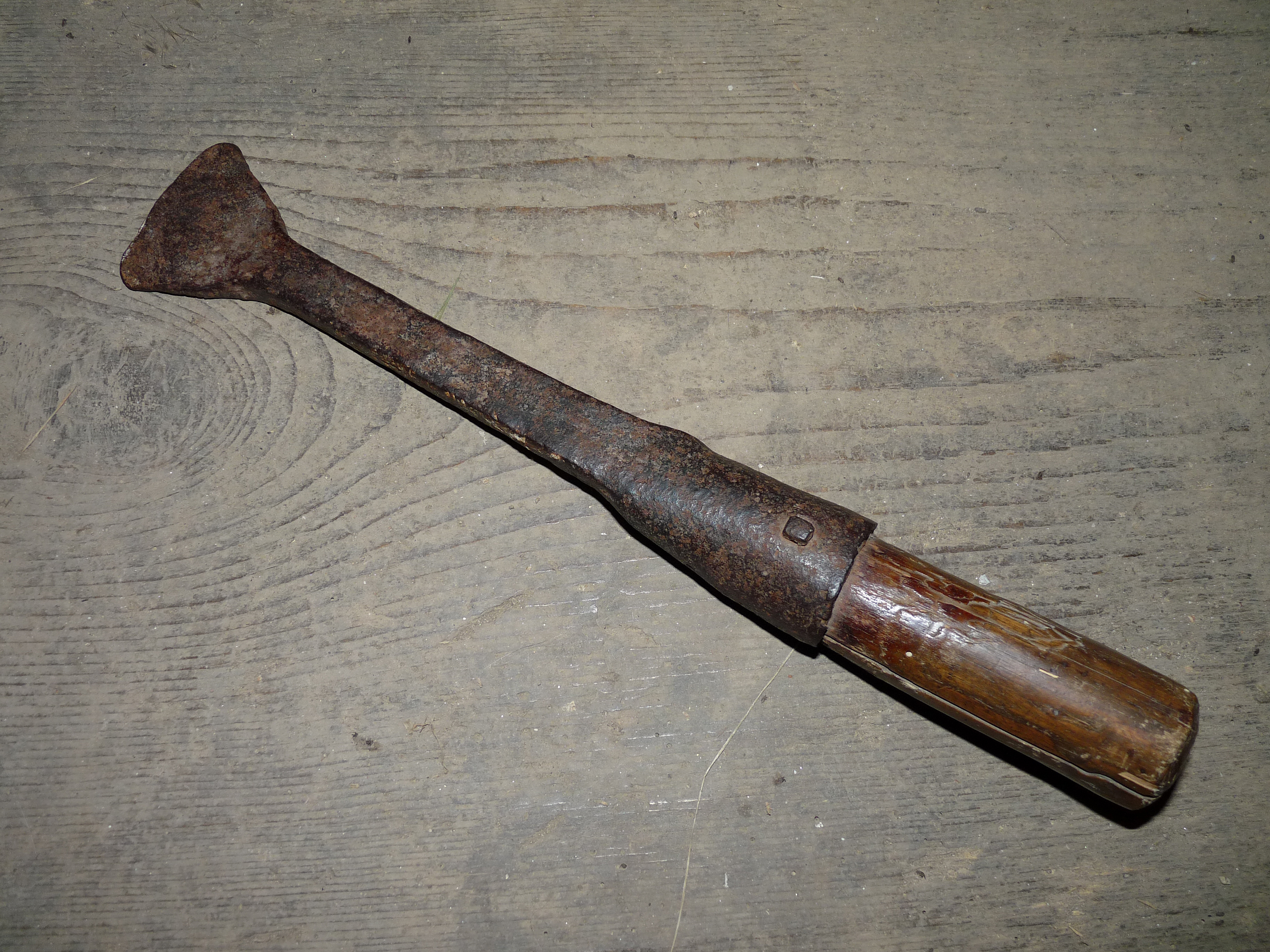
Instrument for cleaning a plowshare used at a mill near Horažďovice, Czech Republic

In agriculture, a plowshare (US) or ploughshare (UK; /ˈplaʊʃɛər/) is a component of a plow (or plough). It is the cutting or leading edge, preceding the moldboard, and it closely follows the coulter (one or more ground-breaking spikes) when plowing.

The plowshare itself is often a hardened blade dressed into an integral moldboard (by the blacksmith) so making a unified combination of plowshare and moldboard, the whole being responsible for entering the cleft in the earth (made by the coulter's first cutting-through) and turning the earth over.

In well-tilled terrain the plowshare may do duty without a preceding coulter.

In modern plows both coulter and plowshare are detachable for easy replacement when worn or broken.

== History ==
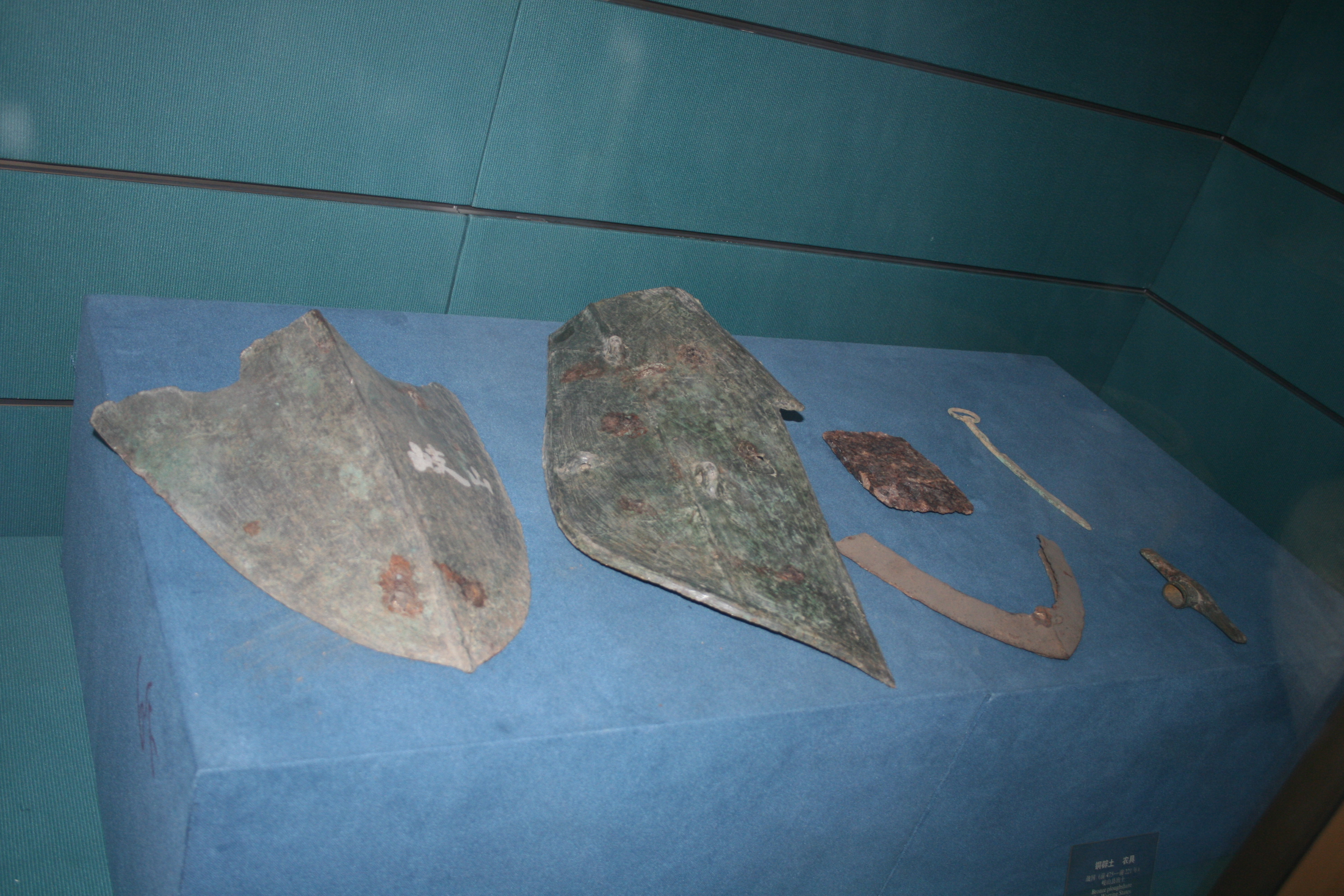
Iron plowshares, Han dynasty

Triangular-shaped stone plowshares are found at the sites of Chinese Majiabang culture dated to 3500 BC around Lake Tai. Plowshares have also been discovered at the nearby Liangzhu and Maqiao sites roughly dated to the same period. The British archaeologist David R. Harris says this indicates that more intensive cultivation in fixed, probably bunded, fields had developed by this time. According to Mu Yongkang and Song Zhaolin's classification and methods of use, the triangular plow assumed many kinds and were the departure from the Hemudu and Luojiajiao spade, with the Songze small plow in mid-process. The post-Liangzhu plows used draft animals.

== In heraldry ==
Plowshares are often used in heraldry.

Arms of Erding

Arms of Tunau

Arms of Leuna

Arms of Erlbach

Arms of Neuler

Arms of the Archdiocese of Cincinnati

== In ancient cultures ==
The ancient phrase from the biblical Book of Isaiah, "to turn swords into ploughshares," is still in common use today. These plowshares represent peaceful use of wartime capabilities. On the other hand, the Book of Joel uses the phrase in reverse, "Beat your plowshares into swords".

However, in classical antiquity during the Battle of Marathon, many Persians were slain by a deadly plowshare-wielding ally who appeared suddenly on the side of the ancient Athenians. After their victory and his disappearance, an oracle told the Athenians to worship the hero under the name Echetlaeus: the hero with the "echetlon", or plowshare.
