= Nike of Callimachus =

Ancient Greek statue created in 490 BC

Nike of Callimachus Nίκη του Καλλιμάχου
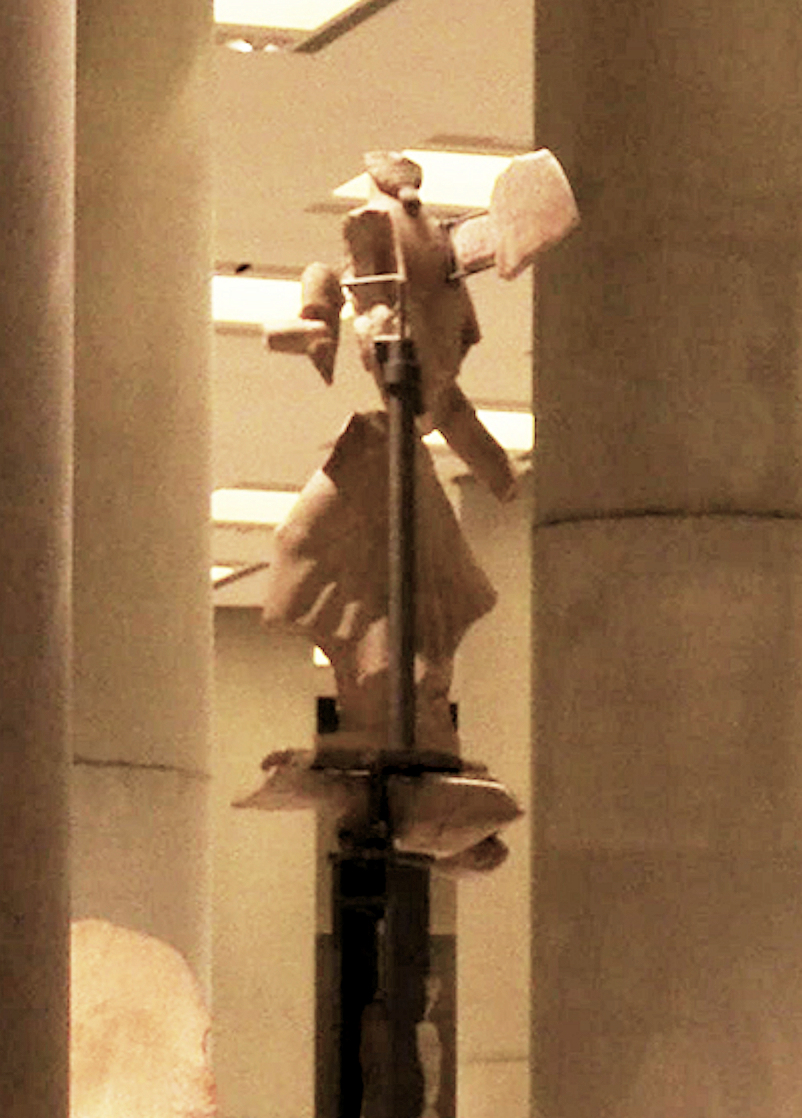
- Reconstitution of the Nike of Callimachus in the Acropolis Museum
- Material: Marble
- Height: 468 centimetres (184 in)
- Writing: Greek
- Created: Archaic Athens, 490 BC
- Discovered: Acropolis of Athens
- Present location: Acropolis Museum, Athens

The Nike of Callimachus (Greek: Nίκη του Καλλιμάχου Níkē tou Kallimákhou) also known as The Dedication of Callimachus, is a statue that the Athenians created in honour of Callimachus.

== History ==
Callimachus was the Athenian polemarch at the Battle of Marathon at 490 BC. He had the last vote and voted in favour of a battle, when the ten strategoi were split evenly on the matter.

He was killed at the battle and the Athenians erected the statue for him.

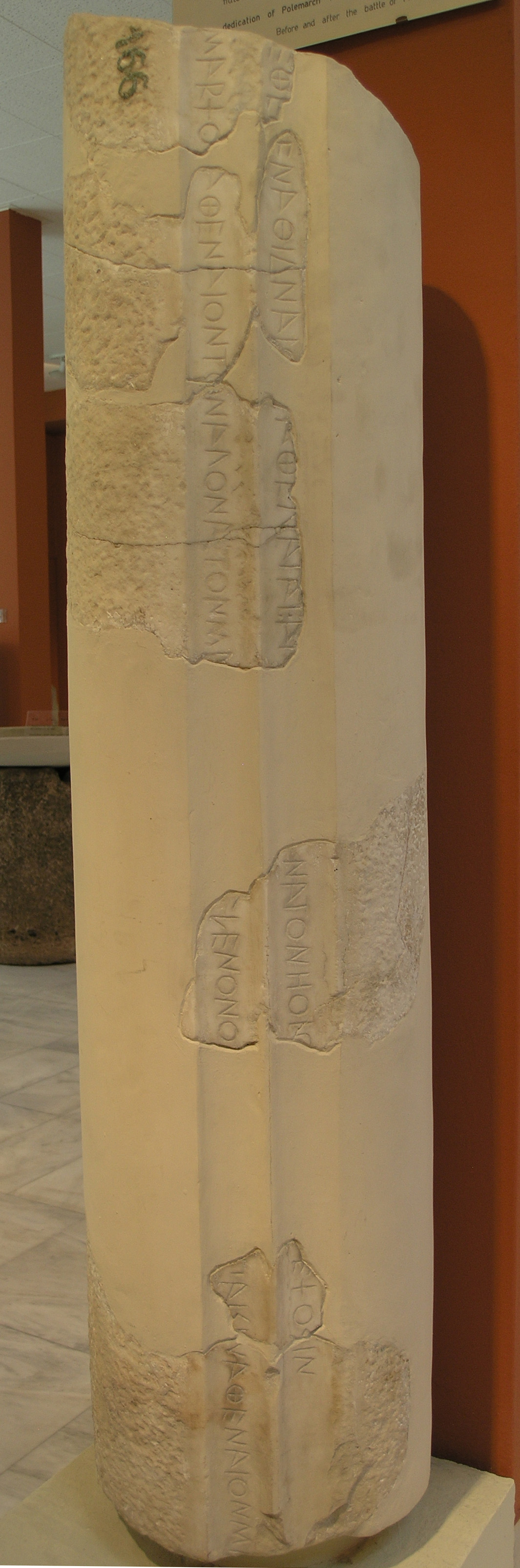
Part of the inscribed column before the restoration when it was on display at the Epigraphical Museum

The statue was erected in a prominent spot near the north-west corner of the Parthenon (not the Parthenon that we can see today, but the previous temple which was destroyed by the Persians) on the Acropolis of Athens. The statue was severely damaged by the Persians a decade later (480 BC) when they conquered Athens. They burned and destroyed the city and its monuments, including the Nike of Callimachus (Perserschutt).

== Statue ==
The statue depicts Nike (Victory), in the form of a draped woman with wings running right, on top of an inscribed Ionic column. Its height is 4.68 metres and was made of Parian or Pentelic marble. Some parts of the statue such as the head, the hands and more were never recovered after the damage.

The neck of the Nike has nine holes for metal jewellery, which has been lost. She probably held a caduceus in her hand.

== Inscription ==
The text of the inscription on the monument was carved in two vertical lines. Only 35% of the original text is visible due to the destruction. The text on the column is below (the brackets indicate text which is missing because of the destruction and has been restored by Catharine Keesling):

line 1
[Καλλιμάχος μ' ἀν]έθεκεν Ἀφιδναῖο[ς] τ'Αθεναίαι	(Hexameter 1)
ἀν[γελον ἀθ]ανάτον hοἰ Ὀ[λύνπια δόματα] ἔχοσιν	(Hexameter 2)
[Kallimachos] of Aphidna [de]dicated [me] to Athena,
me[ssenger of the imm]ortals who have [homes on] O[lympus]
line 2
[Καλλιμάχος πολέ]μαρχος Ἀθεναίον τὸν ἀγο̑να	(Hexameter 3)
τὸν Μα[ραθο̑νι πρὸ H]ελένον, ο[. . .]	(Hexameter 4)
παισὶν Ἀθεναίον μν[εμα . . .]	(Hexameter 5)
[Kallimachos the pole]march of the Athenians, who fought the battle
at Ma[rathon for the H]ellenes (Greeks), [. . .]
by/for the children of the Athenians, a memorial [. . .]

== Restoration ==
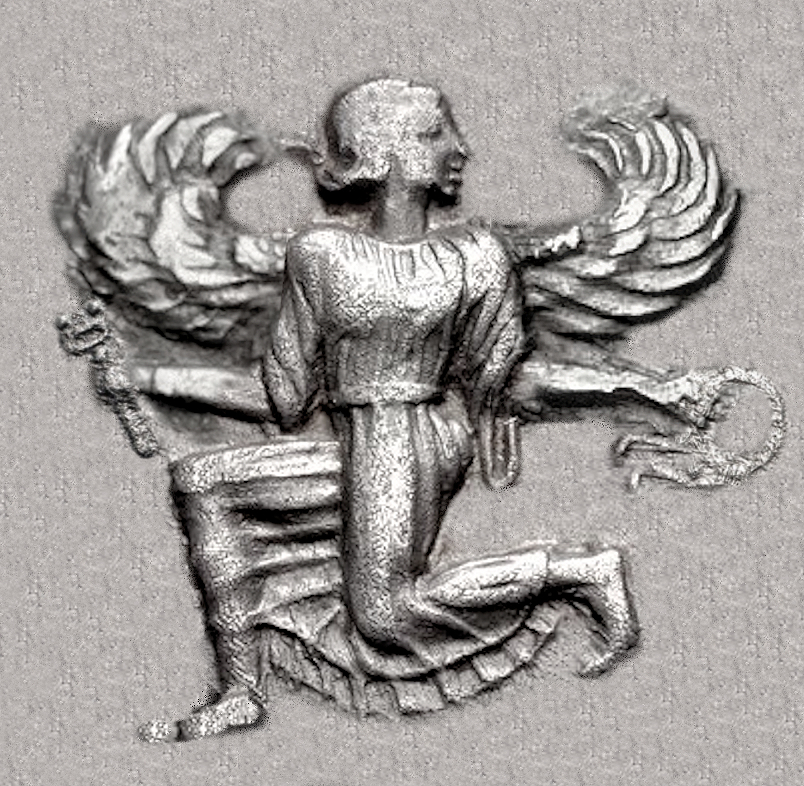
General iconographical type of the reconstituted Nike of Callimachus, here seen on the contemporary coinage of Artemisia of Caria.

In 2010, the Nike monument was restored and put on display in the new Acropolis Museum, alongside a reconstruction showing how the monument may have originally looked. The restoration was designed to allow other fragments of the monument to be attached in future if more are discovered. The restored Nike monument was unveiled in 2010 as part of a series of events organised by the Greek Ministry of Culture and Tourism commemorating the 2,500th anniversary of the Battle of Marathon. At the unveiling, Pavlos Geroulanos, the Greek minister of tourism, said:

“Today we are not unveiling the monument of just another heroic general but a monument to a democratic process that changed the course of history."

He also reminded the audience of the words that Miltiades said to Callimachus just before the polemarch cast his vote:

“Everything now rests on you.”

== See also ==
- Achaemenid destruction of Athens
- Nike Fixing her Sandal
- Nike of Paionios
- Winged Victory of Samothrace
