= Marathon tumuli =

Tumuli in Greece

Coordinates: 38°07′04″N 23°58′42″E

There are two tumuli at Marathon, Greece. One is a burial mound (Greek τύμβος, tymbos, tomb), or "Soros" that houses the ashes of 192 Athenians who fell during the Battle of Marathon in 490 BC. The other houses the inhumed bodies of the Plataeans who fell during that same battle. The burial mound dominates the plain of Marathon, where the eponymous battle took place, along with the tumulus of the Plataeans, and a victory column erected by the Athenians to commemorate their victory over Darius' Persian expedition. The tumulus is encompassed in a park today.

== Battle of Marathon ==
The Battle of Marathon took place on September 12, or possibly August 12, 490 BCE at the plain of Marathon. Athens and its ally Plataea, some 11,000 hoplites in total, attacked a Persian expeditionary force of some 25,000 infantry and 1,000 cavalry, with 100,000 armed sailors acting as reserves. The Athenian forces attacked down a hillside onto the coastal plain, and using the momentum of their tightly packed, heavily armored formation routed the less disciplined Persian flanks, which were unused to fighting heavily armored troops. The subsequent rout left the Persian center exposed and as a result the Persians suffered high casualties as their command structure fell into disarray and as soldiers scrambled onto their ships. Herodotus claims that the Greeks counted 6,400 dead Persians on the field, but could make no account for those who fled into the swamps off to the north of the battlefield. Herodotus states that the Athenians lost 192 men in the battle and the Plataeans lost 11.

== Monuments ==
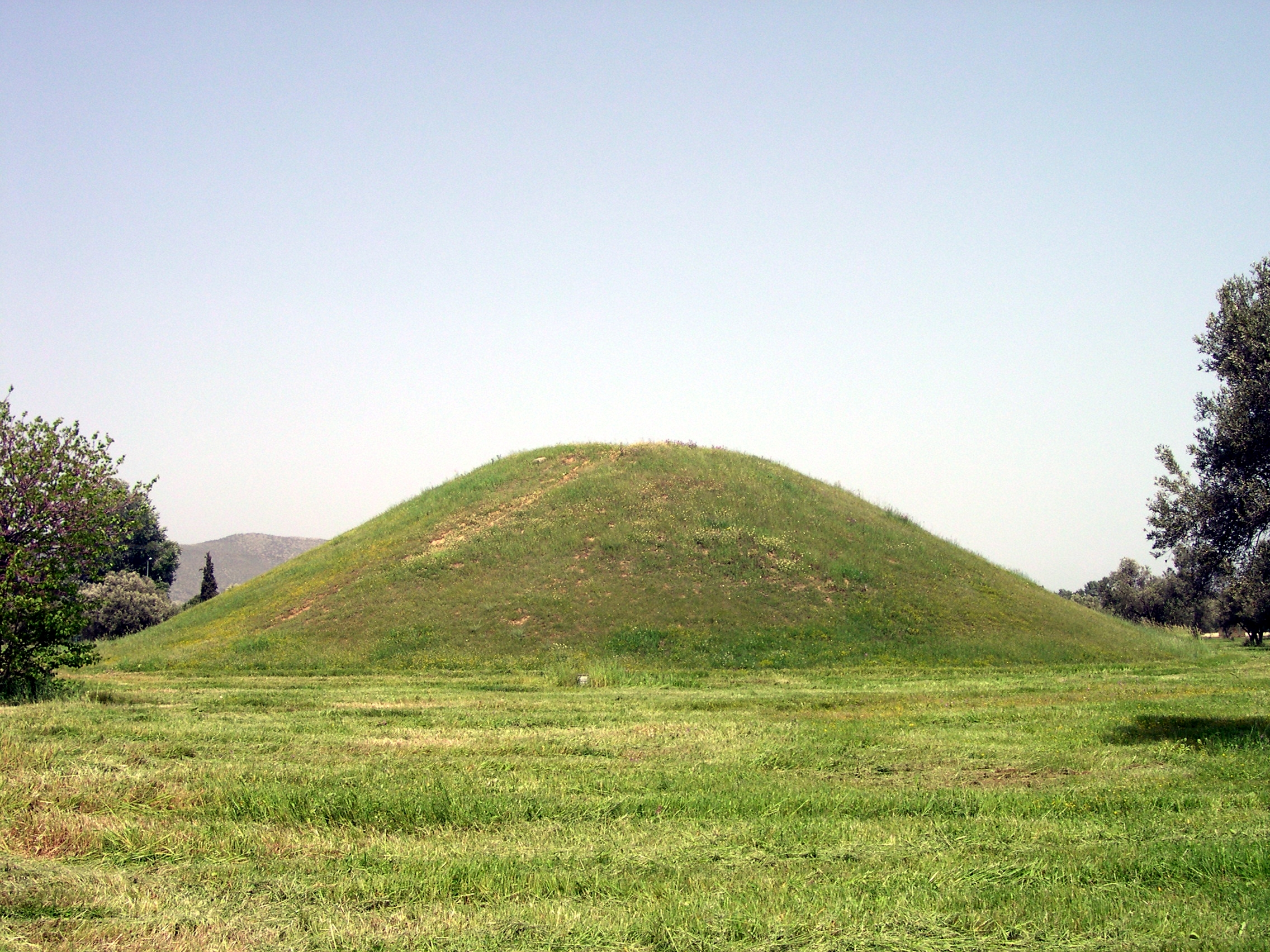
The Tumulus of the Athenians

There are three monuments of the plain of Marathon, the Athenian Tumulus, the Plataean Tumulus, and a victory column erected by the Athenians. Both tumuli are fairly standard with hemispherical shapes and with the dead interred within the hole left by the excavation of the dirt that would be piled on top of them. The tumuli are unusual, however, because such monumental burial practices had been out of style in central Greece since the seventh century. The Athenians normally buried their war dead in the Kerameikos cemetery, with a stele or marker vase to show the location of the deceased. However, some scholars have suggested that the raising of the tumuli was a deliberate attempt to evoke Homer by the Athenians and their allies. This concept is based on the similarities between the structure and interment method used with the tumuli, and the description of the burial practices used by and for their mythical heroes in the Iliad.

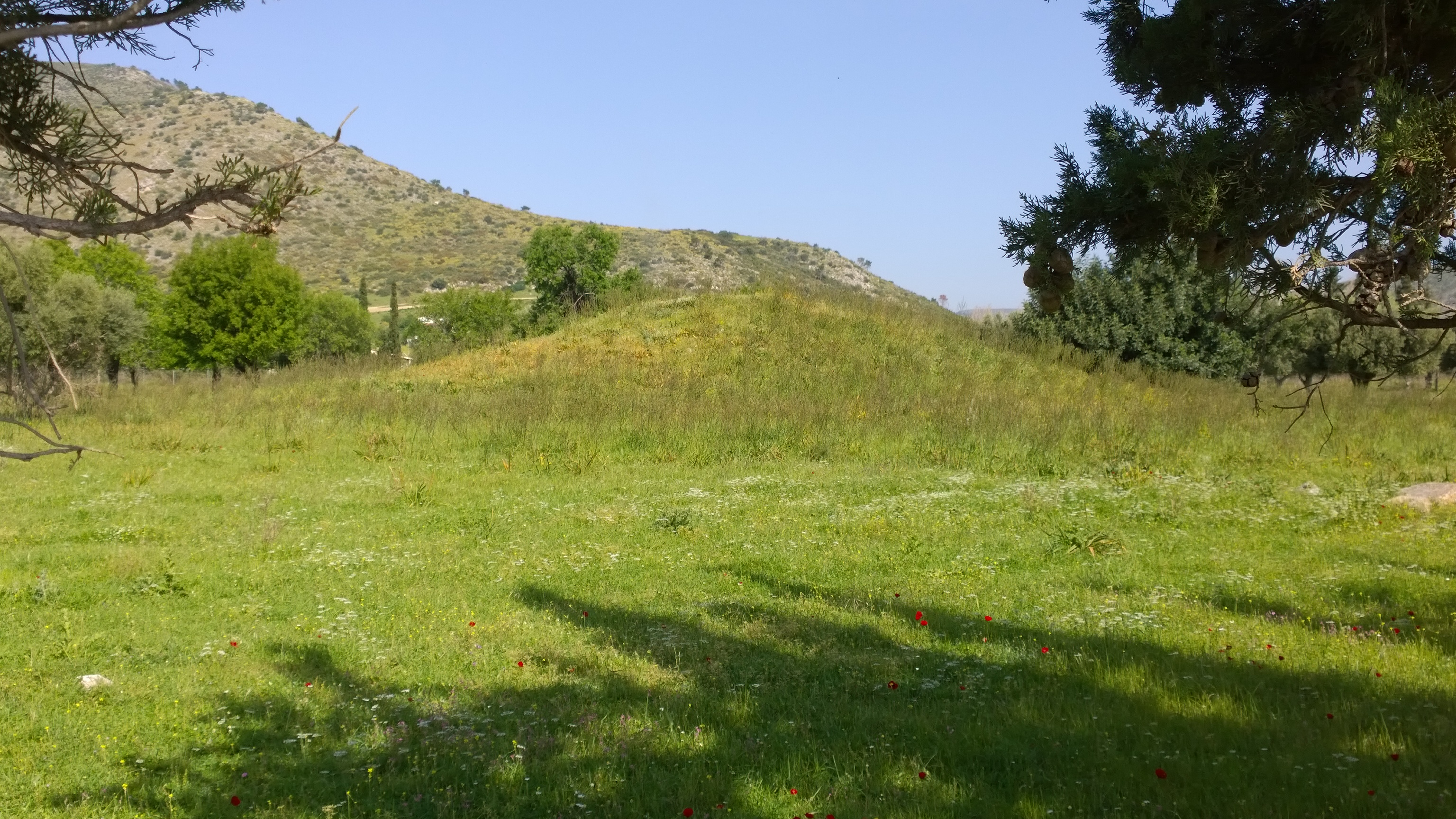
The Tumulus of the Plataeans

The Athenian Tumulus stands around 40 feet (12 m) tall and was excavated in 1884 by Dimitrios Philios and then again in 1890 and 1891 by Valerios Stais. The Plataean Tumulus is smaller at around 10 feet (3.0 m), and was identified and excavated in 1970 by Prof. Marinatos, who was the Greek Inspector General of Antiquities at that time. A large layer of ash and charred bone was found in the Athenian Tumulus while multiple bodies were found inhumed in the Plataean Tumulus. The Victory Column has since collapsed and been replaced with a modern replica which matches the original both in height and in general mass.
