= Cynaegirus =

Athenian general and brother of Aeschylus (died 490 BC)

- Κυνέγειρος or Κυναίγειρος
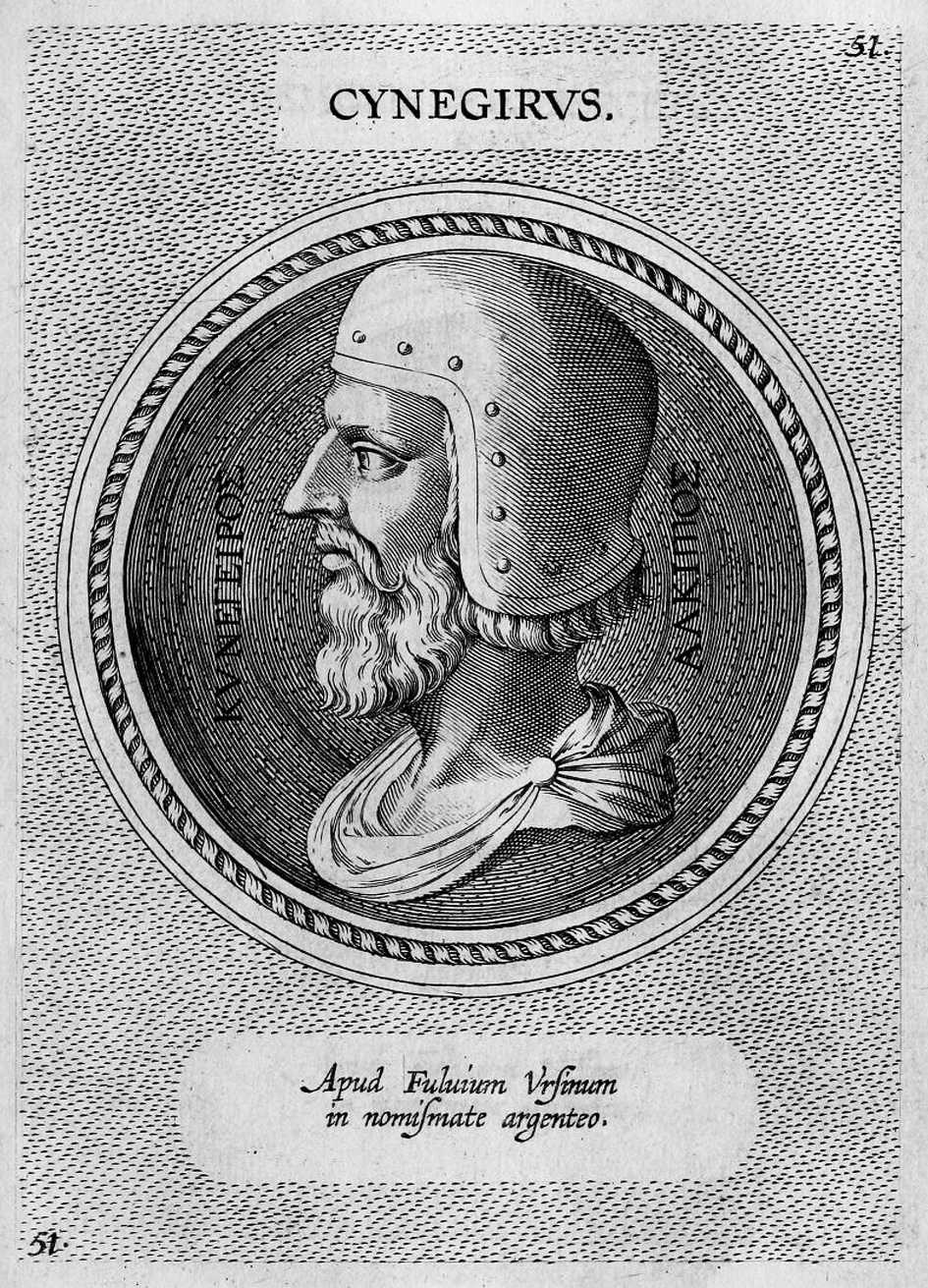
- Born: Eleusis
- Died: 490 BC; Marathon
- Relatives: Aeschylus (brother); Ameinias (brother); Philopatho (sister); Philocles (nephew); Euphorion (father)
- Military career
- Allegiance: Athens
- Rank: General
- Conflicts: Battle of Marathon
- Memorials: At Elefsina there is a monument dedicated to him; He was portrayed among the Athenian gods and heroes at the wall‐paintings on the Stoa Poikile

Cynegirus or Cynaegirus /ˌsɪnəˈdʒaɪrəs/ (Ancient Greek: Κυνέγειρος, romanized: Kunégeiros or Κυναίγειρος, Kunaígeiros; died 490 BC) was an ancient Greek general of Athens. His two brothers were the playwright Aeschylus and Ameinias, a hero of the battle of Salamis, while his sister was Philopatho (Φιλοπαθώ), the mother of the Athenian tragic poet Philokles. He was the son of Euphorion (Εὐφορίων) from Eleusis and member of the Eupatridae, the ancient nobility of Attica.

== The Battle of Marathon ==
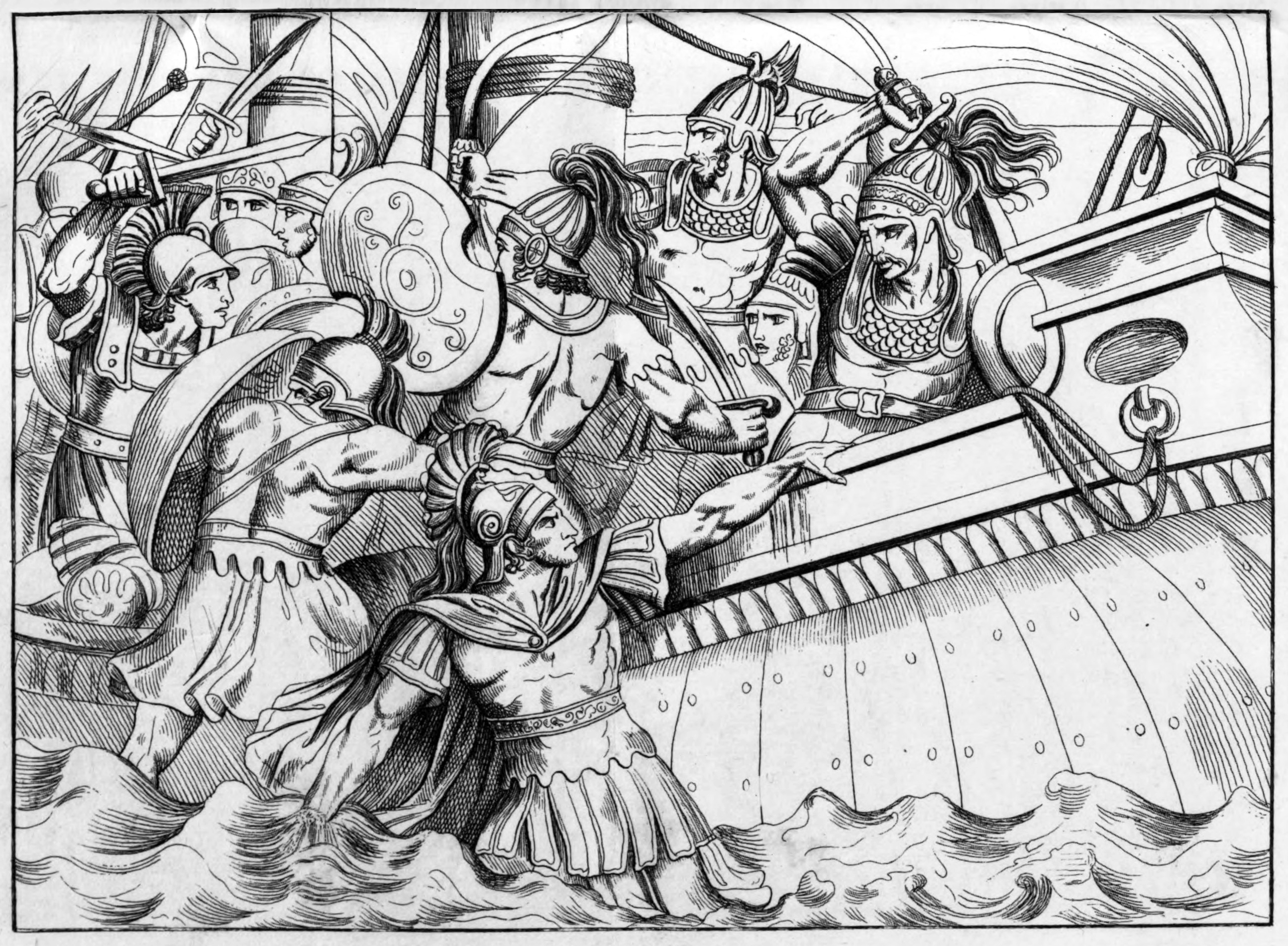
Cynaegirus grabbing a Persian ship at the Battle of Marathon (1832 illustration)

In 490 BC, Cynegeirus and his brothers Aeschylus and Ameinias fought to defend Athens against Darius's invading Persian army at the Battle of Marathon. According to Plutarch, Cynegeirus was one of the Athenian Generals.

Despite their numerical superiority, the Persians were routed and fled to their ships. The Athenians pursued them, and Cynegeirus in his attempt to hold on the stern of a Persian ship with his bare hands had his hand cut off with an axe and died. According to another version of his death, recorded by the Roman historian Justin, when Cynaegyrus lost his right hand, he grasped the enemy's vessel with his left, but Persians cut off this hand too. Here the hero, having successively lost both his hands, hangs on by his teeth, and even in his mutilated state fought desperately with the last mentioned weapons, "like a rabid wild beast!" The Suda encyclopedia writes that Cynaegirus held the ship with his right hand, when the hand was cut off, he held it with his left and when this hand was also cut he fell and died.

This episode inspired the ancient Greek painter Polygnotus, who painted it the Stoa Poikile in Athens in 460 BC, which the ancient traveler and geographer Pausanias described in his 2nd century AD work. Pliny in his Natural History (35.57) mentions that Panaenus, in his painting of the Battle at Marathon, rendered a portrait of Cynaegirus on the field.

The incident of the heroic death of Cynaegeirus became an emblem of cultural memory in ancient Greece and was described in literature in order to inspire patriotic feelings to future generations.

Contemporary Athenian custom dictated that the city choose a man held in high regard to deliver an oration over the war dead at the end of public funeral rites. Polemon of Laodicea, a sophist flourishing six centuries after the event, imagined the aftermath of the battle to have occasioned a public dispute between the fathers of Cynaegeirus and Callimachus before an Athenian assembly to decide which should give such an oration over the Marathon dead; using this fictional situation to exercise his rhetorical skill, Polemon made declamations for each litigant.

At Elefsina there is a monument dedicated to him.
