= Callimachus (polemarch) =

Athenian polemarch at Battle of Marathon in 490 BC

- Καλλίμαχος
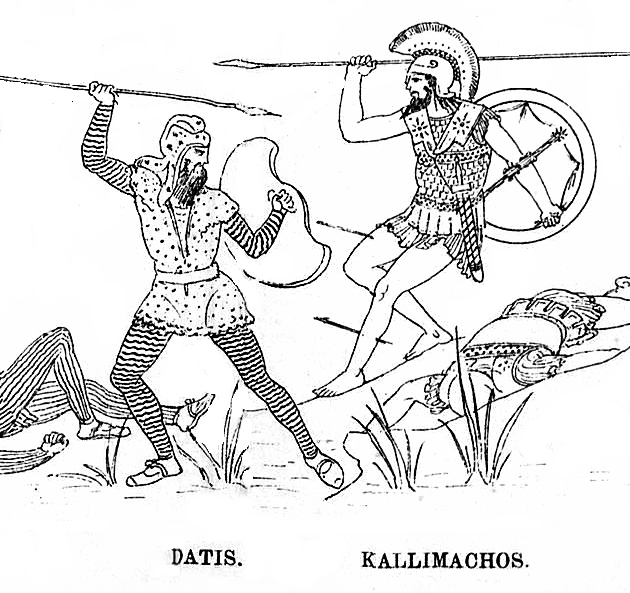
- Datis fighting Kallimachos at the Battle of Marathon, in the Stoa Poikile (reconstitution)
- Born: Afidnes
- Died: 490 BC; Marathon †
- Military career
- Allegiance: Athens
- Rank: Polemarch
- Conflicts: Battle of Marathon
- Memorials: The statue of the "Nike of Callimachus"; He was portrayed among the Athenian gods and heroes on the wall-paintings of the Stoa Poikile

Callimachus /kəˈlɪməkəs/ (Ancient Greek: Καλλίμαχος, romanized: Kallímakhos) was the Athenian polemarch at the Battle of Marathon, which took place during 490 BC. According to Herodotus, he was from the Attica deme of Aphidna.

== The Battle of Marathon ==
As polemarch, Callimachus had a vote in military affairs along with the 10 strategoi, including Miltiades.

Herodotus recounted the speech given by Miltiades to Callimachus to convince him to vote in favour of the battle.

Now the opinions of the generals of the Athenians were divided, and the one party urged that they should not fight a battle, seeing that they were too few to fight with the army of the Medes, while the others, and among them Miltiades, advised that they should do so. ... The polemarch was Callimachos ... [and] to him came Miltiades and said as follows: "With thee now it rests, Callimachos, either to bring Athens under slavery, or by making her free to leave behind thee for all the time that men shall live a memorial such as not even Harmodios and Aristogeiton have left. For now the Athenians have come to a danger the greatest to which they have ever come since they were a people; and on the one hand, if they submit to the Medes, it is determined what they shall suffer, being delivered over to Hippias, while on the other hand, if this city shall gain the victory, it may become the first of the cities of Hellas. ... Of us the generals, who are ten in number, the opinions are divided, the one party urging that we fight a battle and the others that we do not fight. Now if we do not, I expect that ... discord will fall upon the minds of the Athenians and so shake them that they shall go over to the Medes; but if we fight a battle before any unsoundness appear in ... the Athenian people, then we are able to gain the victory in the fight."

— Herodotus, Histories, 6.109 (Note: Translated by Macaulay in The History of Herodotus.)

During the battle, as polemarch, Callimachus commanded the right wing of the Athenian army as was the Athenian custom at that time. The right and left wings (the left wing commanded by the Plataeans) surrounded the Persians after a seemingly suicidal charge by the centre line.

Although the Greeks were victorious, Callimachus was killed during the retreat of the Persians while he was chasing them to their ships.

Plutarch, in his work: Moralia. Greek and Roman Parallel Stories mentions that Callimachus was pierced with so many spears that, even when he was dead, he continued to be in an upright posture.

Contemporary Athenian custom dictated that the city choose a man held in high regard to deliver an oration over the war dead at the end of public funeral rites. Polemon of Laodicea, a sophist flourishing six centuries after the event, imagined the aftermath of the battle to have occasioned a public dispute between the fathers of Cynaegirus and Callimachus before an Athenian assembly to decide which should give such an oration over the Marathon dead; using this fictional situation to exercise his rhetorical skill, Polemon made declamations for each litigant.

Callimachus was portrayed among the Athenian gods and heroes on the wall-paintings of the Stoa Poikile. The Athenians erected a statue in honour of Callimachus, the "Nike of Callimachus".

According to some sources, before the battle, Callimachus promised that if the Greeks won, he would sacrifice to Artemis Agrotera as many goats as the number of Persians killed at the battlefield. Athenians kept his promise, in spirit, and every year sacrificed 500 goats, because they didn't have enough goats for every single Persian who was killed at the battle (6,400).

== The statue of the "Nike of Callimachus" ==
After the battle of Marathon, Athenians created a statue in honour of Callimachus. The statue was the "Nike of Callimachus" and it was erected next to the Parthenon (not the Parthenon that we can see today, but the previous temple which was destroyed by the Persians) on the Acropolis of Athens.

The surviving fragments of the statue, depicting the goddess Nike atop a large column and made of Pentelic and Parian marble, are now housed in the Acropolis Museum in Athens.

== See also ==
- First Persian invasion of Greece
