= Polemarch =

Senior military title in various ancient Greek city states

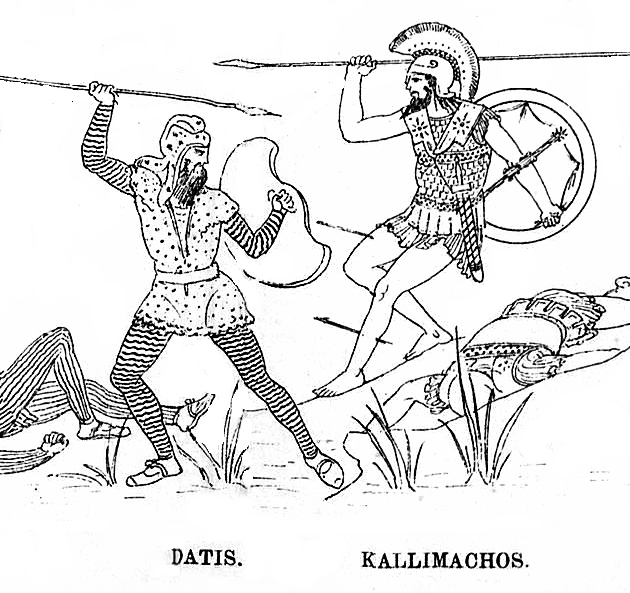
Datis fighting the polemarch of Athens Kallimachos at the Battle of Marathon, in the Stoa Poikile (reconstitution).

A polemarch (/ˈpɒləˌmɑːrk/, from Ancient Greek: πολέμαρχος, polémarchos) was a senior military title in various ancient Greek city states (poleis). The title is derived from the words polemos ('war') and archon ('ruler, leader') and translates as 'warleader' or 'warlord'. The name indicates that the polemarch's original function was to command the army; presumably the office was created to take over this function from the king. The title held a high position in Athenian society, alongside the archon eponymos and the archon basileus. In Athens the polemarch was the commander-in-chief of the armed forces of the city-state.

== Ancient Greece ==
=== Athens ===
In Athens, the polemarchos was one of nine annually appointed archontes (ἄρχοντες) and functioned as the commander of the military, though to what extent is debated among historians.

At the Battle of Marathon Herodotus described the vote of the polemarchos, Callimachus, as the deciding factor during debate over engagement in battle; it is disputed whether this vote implies that the position of polemarchos was an equal to a strategos or that of a commander-in-chief. The polemarchos' military responsibilities continued until 487 BC, when a new procedure was adopted and magistrates were then appointed by lot. Following this reform, the military duties were handled by the strategos. By the mid-5th Century BC, the polemarchos' role was reduced to ceremonial and judicial functions, and primarily presided over preliminary trials involving metics' family, inheritance, and status cases. After the preliminary stage the cases would either continue under the judgement of the polemarchos, or be remitted to tribal or municipal judges. The polemarchos also conducted certain religious sacrificial offerings and arranged the funeral ceremonies for men killed in war.

=== Sparta ===
In the new structure of the Spartan Army, introduced sometime during the Peloponnesian War, a polemarchos was the commander of a mora of 576 men, one of six in the Spartan army on campaign. On occasion however they were appointed to head armies. They were part of the royal army council and the royal escort (δαμοσία) and were supported or represented by officers (συμφορεῖς). The polemarchoi were also responsible for public meals, since, by the laws of Lycurgus, the Lacedaemonians would eat and fight in the same group. Next to their military and connected responsibilities, the polemarchoi were responsible for some civil and juridical tasks (not unlike the archōn polemarchos in Athens).

=== Boeotia ===
In the early 4th century BC several Boeotian poleis instituted the position of polemarchos, though there was no unified policy. Of the surviving accounts, Plutarch and Xenophon describe three polemarchoi as executive officials of Thebes during this period.

== Other uses ==
In modern use, the Greek Letter fraternity Kappa Alpha Psi titles their fraternity leaders as Polemarchs.

== Fictional use ==
This position was featured in Orson Scott Card's novel Ender's Game. In the novel, the position of polemarch was charged with the supreme command of humanity's space fleets, the International Fleet. The Polemarch, along with the positions of Strategos and Hegemon, was one of the three most powerful people alive.

This title was also given to the DC Comics character Artemis of Bana-Mighdall, an Amazon in the Wonder Woman comic books. For a period Artemis served as Paradise Island's co-ruler alongside fellow Amazon Philippus. Whereas Philippus oversaw the day-to-day rule of the island, Artemis oversaw its military aspects.

The title was used to signify soldiers who commanded fortifications and other camps in the 2018 Ubisoft video game Assassin's Creed Odyssey. They were the strongest regular enemies in the game and killing them would lower the "nation power" of a particular state in Greece substantially. Additionally, in 2 of the game's quests, you have to kill 3 polemarchs that are present in either Athenian or Spartan forts across Greece, collect their seals, and bring them to either General Lysander of Sparta or Demosthenes in Athens.

== See also ==
- Navarch – Greek word meaning "leader of the ships"
