= Philocles the Younger =

Tragic poet of ancient Greece

Philocles (Ancient Greek: Φιλοκλῆς) was a tragic poet of ancient Greece who lived in the 4th century BCE and was a member of a large, multigenerational theatre dynasty.

He was the great-grandnephew of Aeschylus, great-grandson of Philocles, grandson of Morsimus, son of Astydamas the Elder, and brother of Astydamas the Younger, all of whom were also notable tragic poets.

Theatre dynasty of Aeschylus

Aeschylus | Philopatho (not a poet)
Euaeon | Euphorion | Philocles
Morsimus | Melanthius
Astydamas the Elder
Astydamas the Younger | Philocles the Younger
Astydamas?

Philocles himself was also a tragic poet, according to the scholiast on Aristophanes. All of his works are lost. Today we know only the title of a single play of his, Phrixus (Φριξος).

The 19th century classicist Karl Ludwig Kayser proposed an elaborate argument to show that there are no grounds for supposing that this Philocles really was a tragic poet, partly related to the fact that the 10th century Byzantine encyclopedia called the Suda describes this Philocles as a military general. Most scholars do not agree with this position, and believe we ought to accept the statement of the scholiast, and to assume strategos (στρατηγός, or military general) in the Suda was an error that ought to have read tragikos (τραγικός, or tragic poet).
