= Thessalus (disambiguation) =

Thessalus is a name that may refer to:

- Thessalus, the name of several figures in Greek mythology
- Thessalus (physician), Greek physician (5th - 4th centuries BCE)
- Thessalus of Tralles, Roman physician (1st century CE)
- Thessalus (actor), a tragic actor in the times of Alexander the Great
  - This Thessalus appears as a character in Steven Pressfield's The Virtues of War
