= Marseille History Museum =

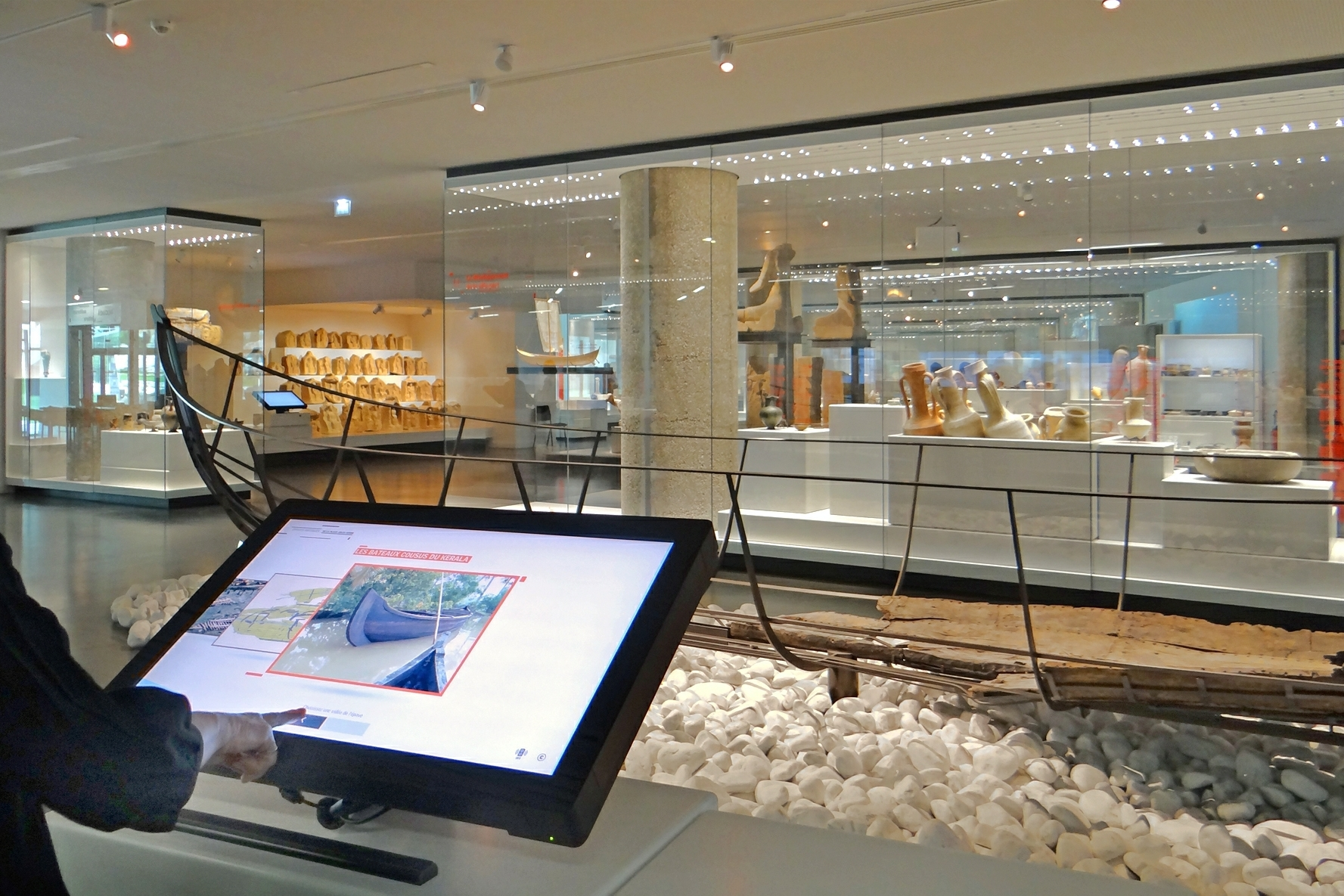

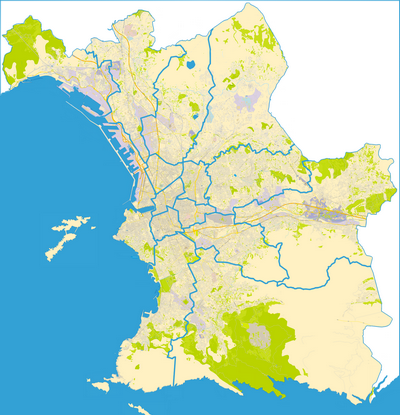
- Location within Marseille Location within France
- Location: 2, rue Henri-Barbusse 13001 Marseille
- Coordinates: 43°17′52.0″N 5°22′32.0″E
- Type: History museum
- Website: www.marseille-tourisme.com

The Marseille History Museum (French: Musée d'Histoire de Marseille; Occitan: Museu d'Istòria de Marselha) is the local historical and archaeological museum of Marseille in France. When opened in 1983, it became one of the most significant museums for urban history in France, dedicated to exhibiting the major archaeological finds discovered after the site was excavated in 1967; at the same time the property was redeveloped commercially and the Centre Bourse shopping arcade constructed. The museum building is entered from within the centre, and opens out onto the "Jardin des Vestiges", an outdoor garden containing the stabilised archaeological remains; it includes classical ramparts, port buildings, and a necropolis.

The Marseille History Museum was completely renovated and reopened on September 14, 2013 on the occasion of Marseille-Provence 2013.

== History ==
The construction of the Center Bourse was undertaken in 1967, on land in the district behind the Bourse, the old buildings of which had been destroyed from 1912 to 1937, and which had been left as they were. During the earthworks for the construction of the shopping center, many remains of Greek, Roman and medieval ages were discovered. Their importance was then a surprise although the existence of the famous wall of Crinas could suggest the discovery of other remains. Gérin Ricard specifies in the book Promenades archeologique published in 1925, that the Greek origin of this wall had been supported by members of the Archaeological Commission as early as 1916.

The creation of a Marseilles history museum therefore seems essential. The archaeologist and anthropologist Alain Nicolas participates in its foundation. It was opened in 1983. Some of the discoveries are kept on site, the ancient port has been converted into the Jardin des Vestiges. The museum then includes a temporary exhibition hall for events on various themes relating to the history of Marseille and a permanent exhibition hall which highlights the various remains discovered. A library specializing in history, archeology and town planning is created and open to the public.

Closed for several years, the history museum was completely renovated by architect Roland Carta and reopened on September 14, 2013, during Marseille-Provence 2013, European Capital of Culture. The new architecture aims to recreate "an intimate link between the city, its museum and the archaeological site" of the ancient Port. A new museography created by the architect scenographer Adeline Rispal weaves links between the port and commercial history of the site and the powerful architecture of the Bourse shopping centre. The museum presents the history of Marseilles in thirteen parts or sequences covering a more or less long period. An enhanced digital tour of the historical axis of Marseille, designed by Alain Dupuy (InnoVision), is also offered between the History Museum and the new MuCEM.

== Highlights ==
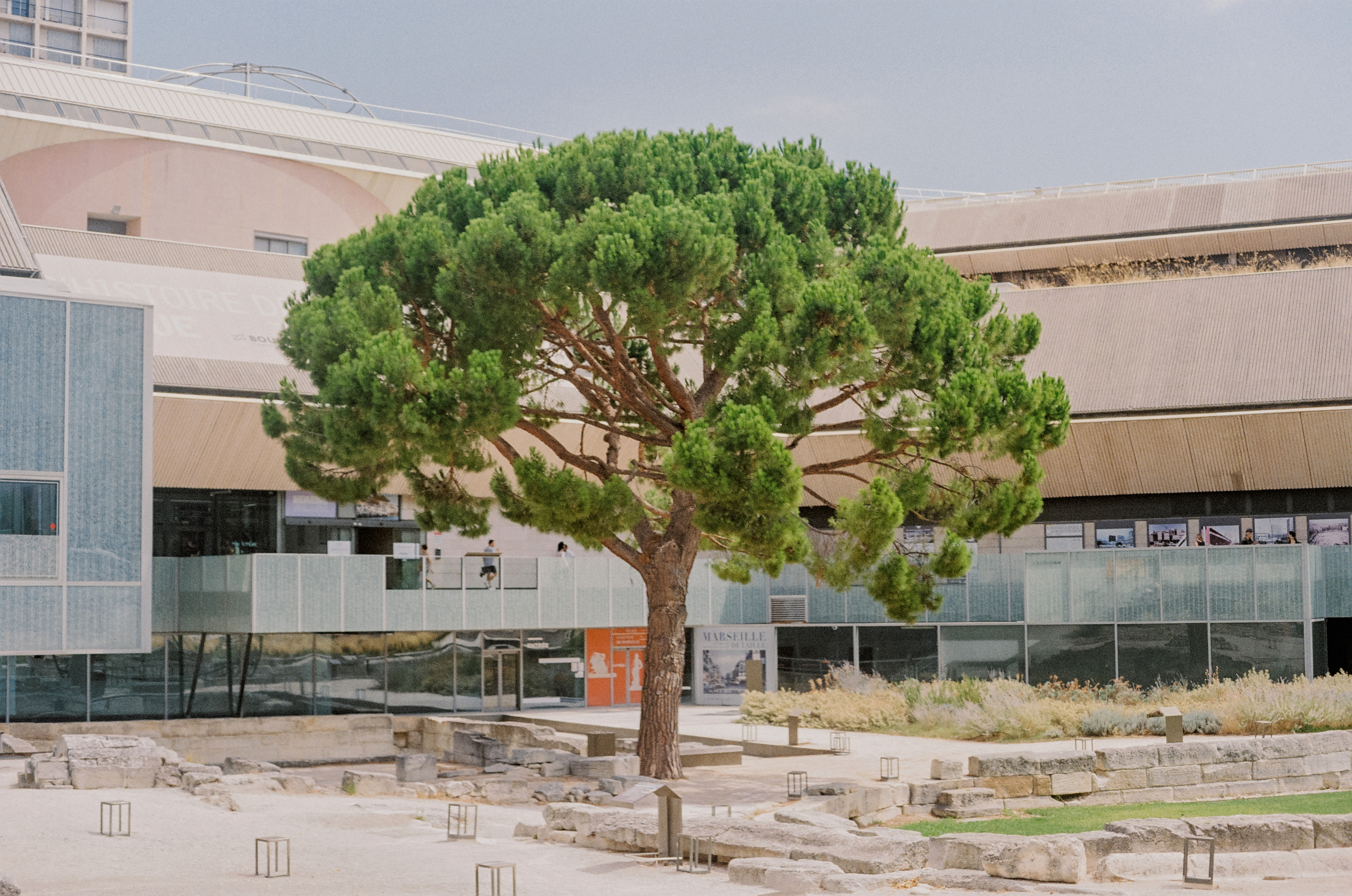
Open courtyard of the Marseille History Museum, the Jardin des Vestiges (aka Garden of Ruins)

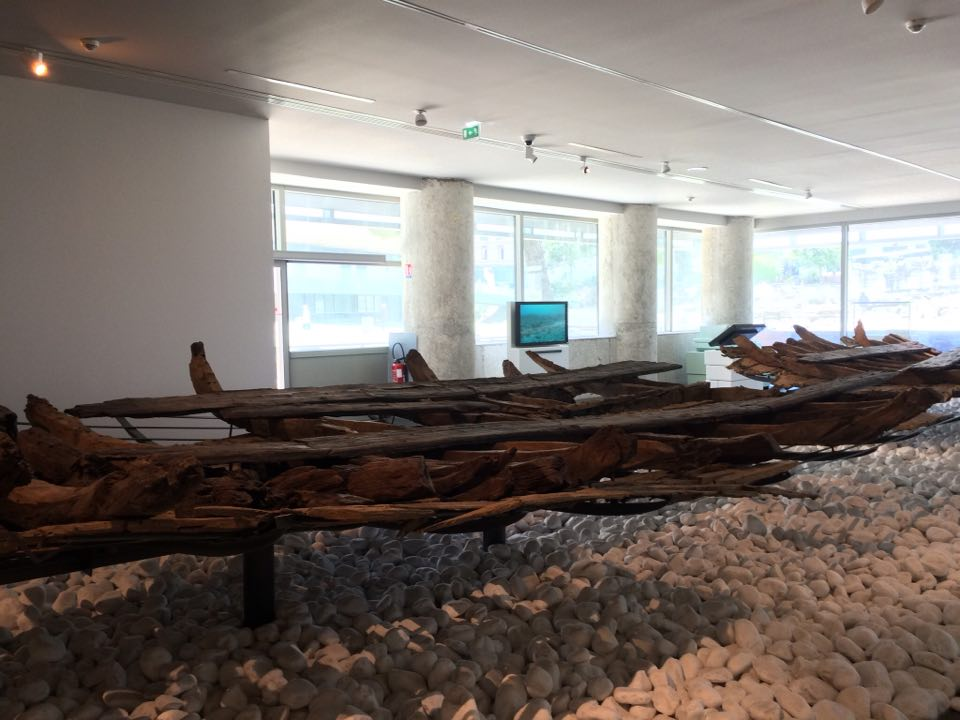
Roman wreck Jules-Verne 4. The wreck is of a 15 m-long (49 ft) dredger

Installed in the Center Bourse, near the Old Port, the Marseille History Museum houses the site of the Jardin des Vestiges, a permanent exhibition of 3,500 m^{2} (38,000 sq ft), a temporary exhibition space, a documentation center and an auditorium, making it the most important urban history museum in France. The museum presently contains permanent displays exhibiting the history of Marseille up to the 18th century. Highlights include:

- some of the finds from the site itself, including, most famously, the hull of a ship of the 2nd century (claimed to be the best preserved vessel of this period in the world);
- the prehistory of the region round the later city, the Ligures and the Phocaeans, and the development through the Ancient Greek and Roman periods of the port of Massilia;
- early Christianity (4th-6th centuries);
- medieval potters' workshops and the first French manufacture of faience (13th century);
- the redevelopment of the city under Louis XIV and the construction of the forts of Saint-Jean and Saint-Nicolas;
- the architecture and building works of the architect, sculptor and painter Pierre Puget;
- the Great Plague of 1720.

Further building works are planned which, when completed, will assure permanent exhibitions of Marseille's history for the 19th and 20th centuries.

The museum also includes a library, documentation centre, and video collection.

== Sources ==
- Marseille City website: museum webpage (in French)
- Centre de la Bourse website: museum webpage (in French)
