= Morsimus =

Tragic poet of ancient Greece

Morsimus or Morsimos (Ancient Greek: Μόρσιμος) was a tragic poet of the 5th century BCE, around 450 to 400 BCE, and the member of a large dynasty of tragic poets. None of his plays survive.

He was the son of Philocles, brother of Melanthius, grandnephew of Aeschylus, the father of Astydamas the Elder, grandfather of both Astydamas the Younger and Philocles the Younger. All of these were tragic poets of some renown.

Theatre dynasty of Aeschylus

Aeschylus	Philopatho (not a poet)
Euaeon	Euphorion	Philocles
Morsimus	Melanthius
Astydamas the Elder
Astydamas the Younger	Philocles the Younger
Astydamas?

Unlike most of his tragic poet family, Morsimus does not appear to have been very successful as a playwright. His plays are described in some sources as "wretched". He is attacked and ridiculed several times by the comic playwright Aristophanes, whose cutting criticisms are probably in large part responsible for Morsimus's negative reputation. Aristophanes wrote a character who describes the experience of performing in one of Morsimus's plays as being comparable to being "drenched in urine", and describes anyone who ever helped distribute the texts of Morsimus as a villain deserving the worst punishments in Hades, the same as the ones visited on parricides. Though it's also true that we have fragments of the comic poet Plato's that suggest at least some of Morsimus's contemporaries thought warmly of his work. Other scholars observe that the fact we have jokes at Morsimus's expense spanning several decades might indicate a certain staying power of his work.

Besides his profession as a poet, he seems to have practiced as a physician and oculist, though biographical sources describe him as equally talentless in drama and medicine.

Frigidity seems to have been the predominant characteristic of his poetry.
