= Athenodorus (actor) =

4th-century BC Greek actor

Athenodorus (Ancient Greek: Ἀθηνόδωρος) was a tragic actor, victor at the Dionysia in 342—in the Antigone of Astydamas—and 329 BC. He performed also at the games after the victorious siege of Tyre in honour of Heracles in 331 BC, with the Cypriot Pasicrates of Soli being his choregos, and was victorious over Thessalus, whom Nicocreon of Cyprus supported and Alexander himself favored. Soon afterwards he returned to Athens, as his Dionysiac victory of 329 shows. At some point Athenodorus was fined by the Athenians for failing to appear at the festival, and he asked Alexander to intercede in writing on his behalf; Alexander instead paid his fine. In 324 Athenodorus reappears at the Susa wedding festival, along with Aristocritus and Thessalus.
