= Astydamas the Elder =

Tragic poet of ancient Greece

Astydamas (Ancient Greek: Ἀστυδάμας) was a tragic poet of ancient Greece who lived around the turn of 4th century BCE, from roughly 423 to 363 BCE. He is very often confounded in ancient sources with his more well known and successful son Astydamas the Younger, who was also a tragic poet.

Astydamas was a member of a large, multigenerational theatre dynasty. He was the son of Morsimus, grandson of Philocles, and nephew of Aeschylus (by way of Morsimus's wife, who was Aeschylus's sister), all of whom were renowned tragic poets. Astydamas's sons, Astydamas and Philocles, were both also tragic poets, and there is a later, more obscure tragic poet named Astydamas who may have been this Astydamas's grandson or great-grandson.

Theatre dynasty of Aeschylus

Aeschylus	Philopatho (not a poet)
Euaeon	Euphorion	Philocles
Morsimus	Melanthius
Astydamas the Elder
Astydamas the Younger	Philocles the Younger
Astydamas?

All of his works are lost and we do not even have any of the titles of his plays. He had two sons, Astydamas the Younger and Philocles the Younger.
