= Charmis of Marseilles =

Roman physician

Charmis of Marseilles (Ancient Greek: Χάρμις; fl. 1st century AD) was a famous Roman physician. A native of Massilia, he came to Rome during the reign of Nero. Pliny counted him as a "completely Greek physician". He achieved great fame and fortune in Rome by introducing the practice of cold bathing, which supplanted the astrological medicine of his fellow townsman Crinas. Crinas had in turn supplanted Thessalus, who followed the principles of the Methodic school of medicine.

It is said that he charged a client two hundred thousand sesterces for his services. He also practiced outside Rome, probably in his native Massilia. After some dealings with a "sick man from the provinces" he was fined a million sesterces by Claudius, who also exiled him.

Nonetheless, according to Pliny, he quickly regained a fortune while in exile in Gaul and after his return in Rome. It is thought that Charmis of Marseilles and the "Charmes" mentioned in Galen's On Antidoctes are the same person. Thus, due to the writings of Galen it is known that he also treated women. An antidote used by him had several benefits, including effectiveness for menstrual problems, as well as the pain-free expulsion of the embryo.
