= Carian War =

- Part of Wars of the Hellenistic States
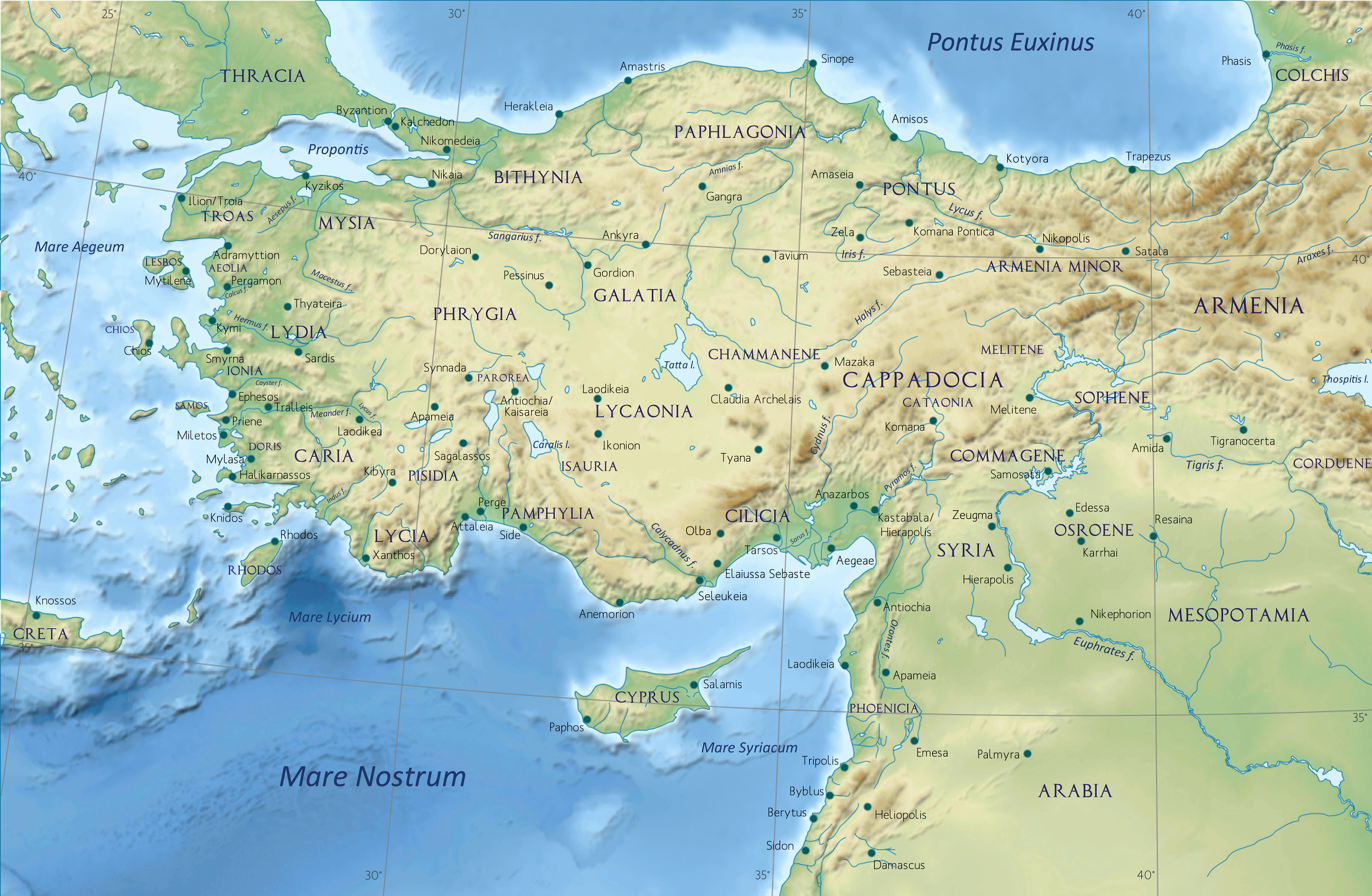
- Map of Asia Minor showing ancient regions (Cilicia, Pamphylia, Lycia, Caria, Ionia) and cities (Samos, Miletus, Halicarnassus, Ephesus)
Date	280 – 279 BC
Location	Asia Minor
Result	Victory for Ptolemaic Egypt

Belligerents
Seleucid Empire	Ptolemaic Egypt

Commanders and leaders
Antiochus I Soter	Ptolemy II Philadelphus

Carian War is the conventional name for the conflict between the Hellenistic states of the Ptolemies and the Seleucids, dated to 280–279 BC.

== Situation in Asia Minor after the war between Seleucus and Lysimachus ==
In February 281 BC, the Syrian ruler Seleucus defeated the king of Macedon and Asia Minor Lysimachus. The latter was killed in battle, and Seleucus was able to absorb the entire state of his opponent. However, by September of the same year, he was treacherously killed by his companion Ptolemy Keraunos, who hastened to seize the throne of Macedon. As for the peninsula of Asia Minor, a number of barbarian states and Hellenistic cities refused to submit to Seleucus's heir Antiochus I, which led to the struggle with the so-called Northern League.

Since at the beginning of Antiochus I's reign he was occupied with suppressing disturbances in the old provinces of the Seleucid Empire and could not devote enough attention to the remnants of Lysimachus's kingdom in Asia Minor, the ruler of Egypt Ptolemy II decided to take advantage of this situation. Continuing the policy of his father, he built a maritime trading empire and was therefore interested in acquiring ports throughout the Hellenistic world. Furthermore, deprived of forests, Egypt needed sources of timber to support its fleet, which could be obtained in Cyprus (captured in the mid-290s), in Phoenicia (held by the Ptolemies since the early 280s), and on the southern coast of Asia Minor.

Since no historical works recounting the events following the deaths of the last Diadochi (namely Lysimachus and Seleucus) have survived to us, researchers have to rely on scarce and fragmented reports and individual inscriptions. In one of his elegies, which is dated to the period between 273 and 270 BC, the poet Theocritus refers to Ptolemy as the ruler of Cilicia, Pamphylia, Lycia, and Caria (which is generally confirmed by several Ptolemaic colonies founded here, as well as inscriptions from individual cities), but it is unknown when exactly these lands passed to the Egyptian kings.

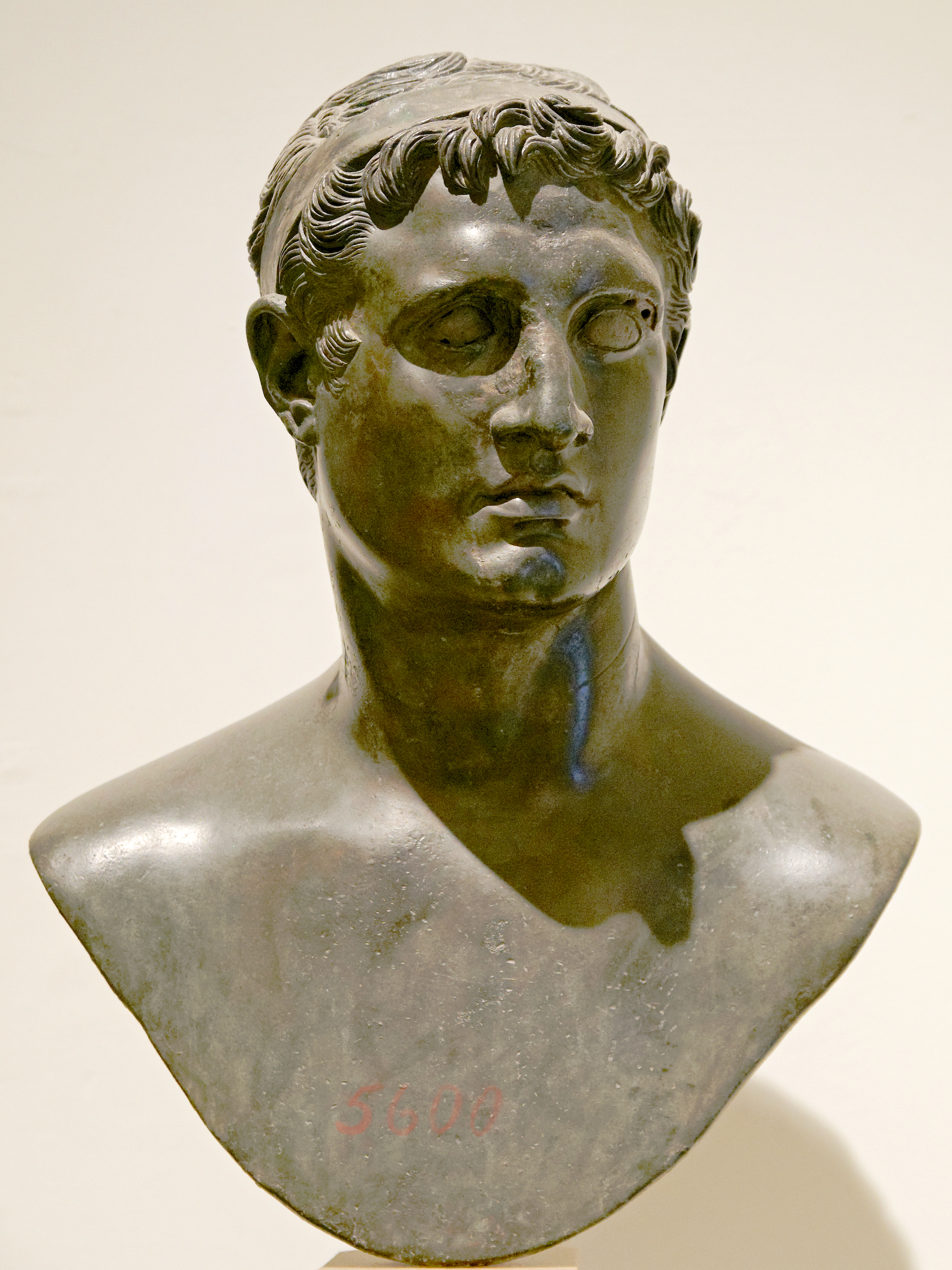
Ptolemy II

== Likely Acquisitions of Ptolemy II in Caria ==
Although there are grounds to believe that Yasos (the northern part of the Carian coast) belonged to Ptolemy I, the acquisition of significant territories in Caria by the Egyptian kingdom likely dates to 280-279 BC. It is also important that this time not only the coastal area was involved, but also certain inland regions (this explains the name of the war proposed by historians). North of the ancient capital of the Carian rulers, Milas, in the city of Amizon, an inscription dated to 277 BC honoring the Egyptian commander Margos has been found (however, it only states the fact of honor without recounting the events that caused it – thus it can only be considered indirect evidence of Ptolemaic influence in Caria). In a settlement to the east of Milas, which was later refounded as Stratonikeia, an inscription dating to the 9th year of Ptolemy II's reign (i.e., 277/276 BC) was discovered. Located on the central Carian coast, Halicarnassus and Mind sent judges to the island of Samos shortly after 280 BC on behalf of this Egyptian king to resolve disputes among its citizens. As for the recently mentioned Milas, there are no confidently dated testimonies, but in the decree of the Seleucid commander, who captured this city during the Second or Third Syrian War, it is mentioned that it was previously governed by the Ptolemies. Considering its location between Halicarnassus, Amizon, and Stratonikeia, there are grounds to assume Milas came under Egyptian control at the same time as they did.

The capture of the city of Cavn, located in the eastern part of the Carian coast near the border with Lycia, may also relate to the Carian War. In this context, the ancient Roman historian Polyen describes an episode of the siege of Cavn, during which Ptolemy's commander Philocles bribed certain city officials. They organized the distribution of bread to the soldiers in such a way that the Egyptians were able to attack the temporarily unguarded city and capture it. However, Philocles is mentioned as early as the beginning of the 300s BC as an associate of Ptolemy I, so this episode could also relate to the period of his struggle against the Antigonids.

At the same time, it is worth noting that the situation regarding the reconstruction of events in Caria is complicated by the presence of the dynasty of Eupolemus, the date and circumstances of whose rule are unknown (his possible date of death — 285-280 BC — very close to the period of the Carian War).

== Possible Acquisitions of Ptolemy II in Ionia ==
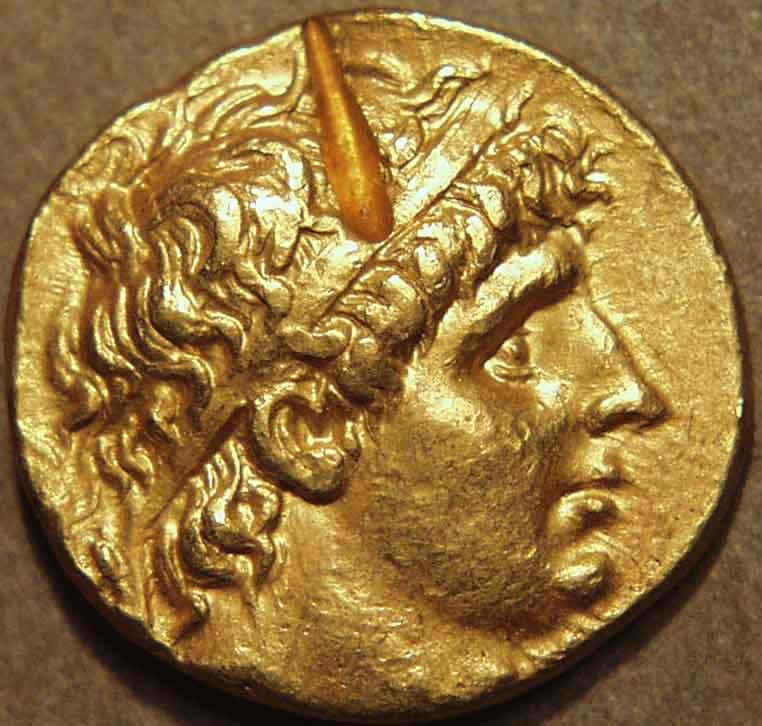
Image on coins of Antiochus I

North of Caria lay the most attractive part of the Asia Minor coastline – Ionia – with its large Greek cities (it was here, in Ephesus, that the last residence of Lysimachus was located). It is believed that no later than 280 BC the Ionian island of Samos came under the control of Ptolemy II, as indicated by a discovered decree in which the Egyptian commander Philocles conducted assemblies of the island league formed in the Cyclades, dedicated to the first festival in honor of the deceased Ptolemy I. However, it cannot be stated unequivocally that Samos belonged to the kingdom of Lysimachus and, accordingly, should belong to Antiochus I as the heir of Seleucus (the identification of Lysimachus as the ruler of the island is based solely on his arbitration in the dispute between the Samians and the inhabitants of Priene).

Some historians also consider the endowment of land by Ptolemy II to the neighboring southern Ionian city of Miletus as evidence of its incorporation into the Egyptian state. This gift from the king is known from an inscription, which is considered key to determining the date of the end of the Carian War—it dates to 279/278 BC and reports the mediation of the Milesians in reaching an agreement with Antiochus I.

In any case, most of Ionia remained in the hands of the Seleucids even after the subsequent First Syrian War—a letter dated 269 BC was found addressed to Antiochus from the Ionian League. Unfortunately, only a fragment remains from the section listing the signatory cities, which includes only the first two names—Ephesus and Lebedos—yet it is unlikely that a minority of participants could represent the league (there were a total of 13 cities in it).

== Other Possible Consequences of the Carian War ==
Thus, regarding Western Cilicia, there are currently no well-substantiated assumptions about the timing of its incorporation into the Egyptian kingdom (for example, the founding of the city of Arsinoe by the strategist Aetos is attributed to the period between 279 and 253 BC). It is possible that this occurred during the same Carian War. The same is suggested for Damascus located in another region, which the Seleucids had to defend in the 270s (however, the Babylonian cuneiform chronicle dates the last episode to 276 BC, thus to the First Syrian War).

== See also ==
- First Syrian War
