= Astydamas =

Tragic poet of ancient Greece

Astydamas (Ancient Greek: Ἀστυδάμας), or sometimes Astydamas the Younger or Astydamas Minor, was a tragic poet of ancient Greece, who lived at Athens and was by far the most celebrated and prolific dramatist of the 4th century BCE. He was active from roughly 373 BCE to 340 BCE.

== Life ==
Astydamas was part of a sprawling, multi-generational theatre family. He was the son of Astydamas the Elder, who was also a dramatist, albeit a lesser known one, and with whom he is very often confused by many ancient sources. This would make him a grandnephew of the renowned tragedian Aeschylus, as well as great-grandson of the tragedian Philocles. He also had a brother named Philocles the Younger, who was also a tragic poet. His grandfather Morsimus was also a tragic poet. The family is often described as "one of the most remarkable theatrical families in Attic history".

Theatre dynasty of Aeschylus

Aeschylus	Philopatho (not a poet)
Euaeon	Euphorion	Philocles
Morsimus	Melanthius
Astydamas the Elder
Astydamas the Younger	Philocles the Younger
Astydamas?

Astydamas was the pupil of the rhetorician Isocrates, and wrote 240 tragedies and took the top prize a virtually unprecedented fifteen times in the Dionysia and Lenaia and other theatre festivals, earning his first victory in 372 BCE. The tenth-century encyclopedia known as the Suda attributes this achievement to the elder Astydamas, but other sources indicate that the 15-time winner was a contemporary of, and competitor to, the tragic poet Theodectes, so it must have been the younger.

There was a later tragedian named Astydamas who may have been the son or grandson of this Astydamas.

== Reputation ==
While none of his plays survive, and modern scholars do not find much in the remaining fragments worthy of praise, Astydamas was unquestionably extremely popular in his time, and there is evidence his plays were still being performed centuries after his death. He was mentioned by Aristotle in his Poetics, and the historian Plutarch wrote that his tragedy Hector was a masterpiece on the level of any by Aeschylus or Sophocles. He is one of extremely few tragic poets whose dates are inscribed on the Parian Chronicle.

== Controversy ==
In the year 340 BCE, his play Parthenopaeus was staged in Athens, with the great actor Thessalus in a starring role, and the Athenians so adored the play they bestowed upon Astydamas a bronze statue at the Theatre of Dionysus, making him the first known playwright to receive this honor (we know of four others). Astydamas then wrote some boastful verse on the base of the statue—namely that he "had no rivals worthy of his powers", and that he "ought to have been born in the time of the great poets of old"—that rankled the Athenians, who erased his writing, though these lines were later immortalized as an epigram in the Greek Anthology. This episode was mocked by later comedians, and gave rise to the ancient Greek proverb "You praise yourself, just like Astydamas" (Σαυτὴν ἐπαινεῖς ὥσπερ Ἀστυδάμας ποτέ).

Some scholars observe that there is scant contemporary reference to this controversy—the anecdote can be traced back no earlier than a few decades after Astydamas's death—so consider that it should not blindly be assumed that the event happened as is described, or happened at all.

An inscribed statue base from the Theatre of Dionysus exists bearing the inscription Ἀστυ[δάμας], and is generally associated with this historical episode.

== Known works ==
- Achilles (Ἀχιλλεύς)
- Ajax the Mad (Αἴας μαινόμενος)
- Alcmaeon (Ἀλκμαίων)
- Alcmene (Ἀλκμήνη)
- Antigone (Ἀντιγόνη)
- Athamas (Ἀθάμας)
- Epigoni (Ἐπίγονοι)
- Hector (Ἕκτωρ)
- Hermes (Ἑρμῆς)
- Lycaon (Λυκάων)
- Nauplius (Ναύπλιος)
- Palamedes (Παλαμήδης)
- Parthenopaeus (Παρθενοπαῖος)
- The Phoenix (Φοῖνιξ)
- Satyric Heracles (Ἡρακλῆς σατυρικός)
- Tyro (Τυρώ)
