= Rispal =

Rispal is a French surname. Notable people with this surname include:

- Adeline Rispal (born 1955), French architect
- Danièle Hoffman-Rispal (1951–2020), French politician
- Jacques Rispal (1923–1986), French actor
- Kareen Rispal, French politician
- Léo Rispal (born 2000), French singer
