= Aristocritus (actor) =

Aristocritus (Ancient Greek: Ἀριστόκριτος) was a famous actor of Greek tragedy who apparently worked in the employ of a young Alexander the Great. He was sent as an emissary by Carian satrap Pixodarus in 337 or 336 BCE to offer the hand of Pixodarus's daughter to Arrhidaeus, the eldest son of Philip II of Macedon, and Alexander's older brother. Alexander later sent another actor, Thessalus, back to Pixodarus with a counter-proposal that he be the one to marry Pixodarus's daughter.

Nothing came of these machinations, other than Alexander earning the irritation of Arrhidaeus, and there was ultimately no wedding. However both Aristocritus and Thessalus must have conducted themselves well, as we know they remained in Alexander's service until the end of his life, being described as participating in the festivities of a great wedding celebration at Susa more than a decade later, in 324 BCE.
