= Jardin des Vestiges =

Garden and ancient site in Marseille, France

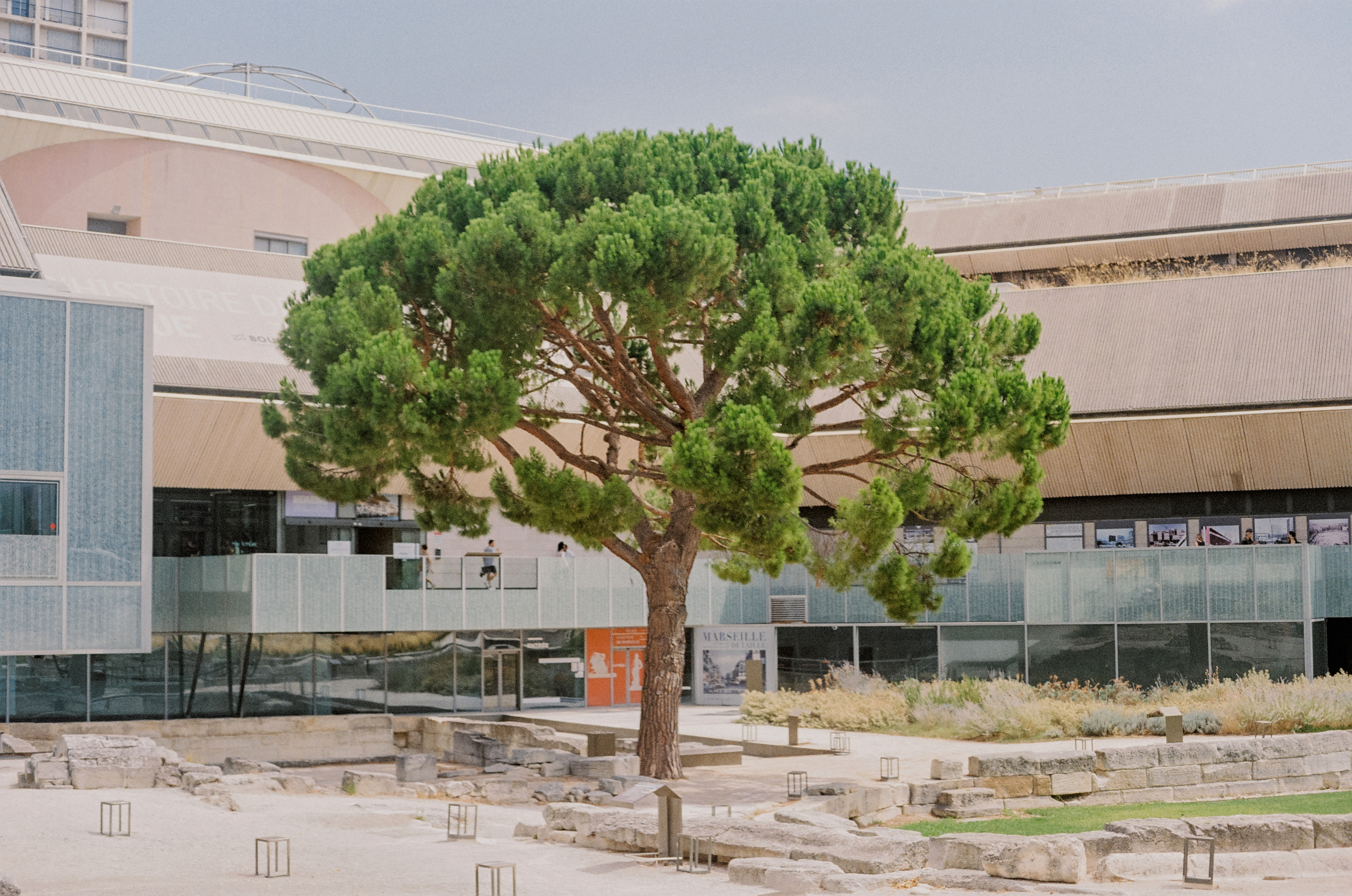
- View of the Jardin des Vestiges.
- Interactive map of Jardin des Vestiges
- 43°17′52″N 5°22′29″E
- Type: Ancient Greek port, city walls
- Periods: Classical Greece, Hellenistic period
- Location: Marseille, Bouches-du-Rhône, France

History
- Built: 6th century BC

The Jardin des Vestiges (Occitan: Jardin dels Vesticis) is a garden containing the archaeological remains of the ancient port of Marseille, France.

The site is located in the 1st arrondissement, behind the shopping arcade in the Centre Bourse. Classified as a French historical monument, it was excavated archaeologically in 1967 and officially opened on 17 October 2009. The site was part of the ancient Greek city of Massalia. It includes parts of the ancient port and city walls, with remains of three square towers and a gateway dating back to the second or third century BC.

== Discovery ==
Limits of the old shore of the port of Massalia around the 1st century BC. The Jardin des Vestiges in the area 1

During the work carried out in 1967 for the construction of the shopping arcade in the "Centre Bourse" in the heart of Marseille, important archaeological remains were unearthed. The extent of this discovery, which concerned the Greek fortifications of Marseille, funerary enclosures and part of the old port, necessitated the classification of approximately 10,000 m^{2} (110,000 sq ft) as a historical monument. The remaining area, of about 20,000 m^{2} (220,000 sq ft), was sacrificed to enable the construction of the Centre Bourse. The excavation lasted ten years and was carried out by the Antiquités historiques and the CNRS. Additional works were carried out later, particularly in 1994.

It is in fact a contact area between on the one hand the ancient city which was located north of the current old port and included the hill of Saint-Jean Saint-Laurent, the Place des Moulins and the hill of Carmes, and on the other hand a suburban and port area outside the ramparts.

A garden, surrounded on three sides by the shopping centre, has been laid out to highlight the vestiges, the results of one of the most important post-war urban excavations carried out in France. The objects discovered are on display at the Marseille History Museum.

== Archaeological remains ==
=== Ancient port and quays ===
Plan of the old port

In Greek times, the old port extended further to the east and up to the northeast forming what is known as the horn of the port which ended in a marshy area. The site where the Augustinian church is located was occupied by the port.

This horn of the port, today planted with grass, spread out in front of the ramparts of the city. Quays that date back to Roman times are visible and are preserved over a length of 180 meters (590 ft); stairs used for unloading goods can still be seen.

This body of water gradually silted up and served as a dumping area. Crockery and various objects were deposited there. A 23-meter-long boat was even abandoned there around the 3rd century BC. It gradually sank into the mud, which ensured its preservation. Uncovered during the excavations, the shipwreck was extracted and preserved using a freeze-drying process. It is currently on display at the Marseille History Museum.

== Greek fortifications ==
The oldest discoveries were made in the northwestern part and involved a portion of the north–south road which dates back to the 6th century BC.

A first rampart made up of a white limestone base from Saint-Victor surmounted by an elevation in raw clay bricks dating from the end of the 5th century BC was also discovered. These fortifications must have been contemporaneous with the large public well, which has now disappeared, located to the north of the area. This archaic rampart was then rebuilt, probably in the second half of the 4th century BC. This new rampart seems to have included, like the previous one, a stone plinth surmounted by an elevation made of large blocks of tuff which replaced the raw bricks. A gate opening onto the route d'Italie in an east–west direction is flanked by two towers or bastions. This wall is clearly visible in the northwest corner of the current garden, preceded by a ditch.

In the second half of the 2nd century BC, the rampart was rebuilt on a large scale, this time in blocks of pink limestone from Cape Couronne, transported by boat. It is this rampart that defended the city during the siege of Julius Caesar in 49 BC. It would remain in use until the beginning of the Middle Ages. The wall was built according to a usual technique of Greek military architecture with two facings built with standardized blocks, the interior being filled with residues from the cutting of blocks or stones from the old rampart.

From north to south are:

=== Wall of Crinas ===
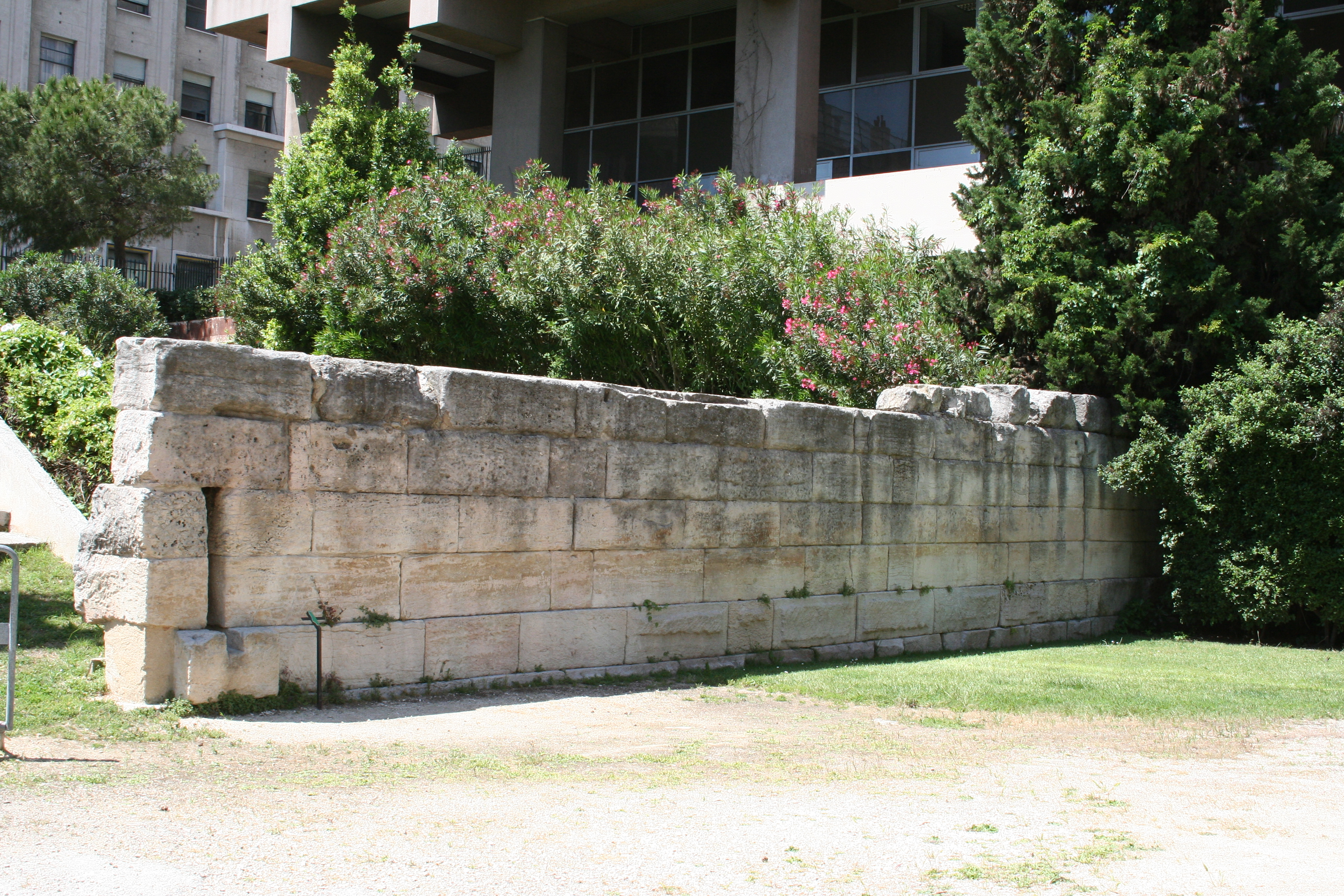
The Wall of Crinas

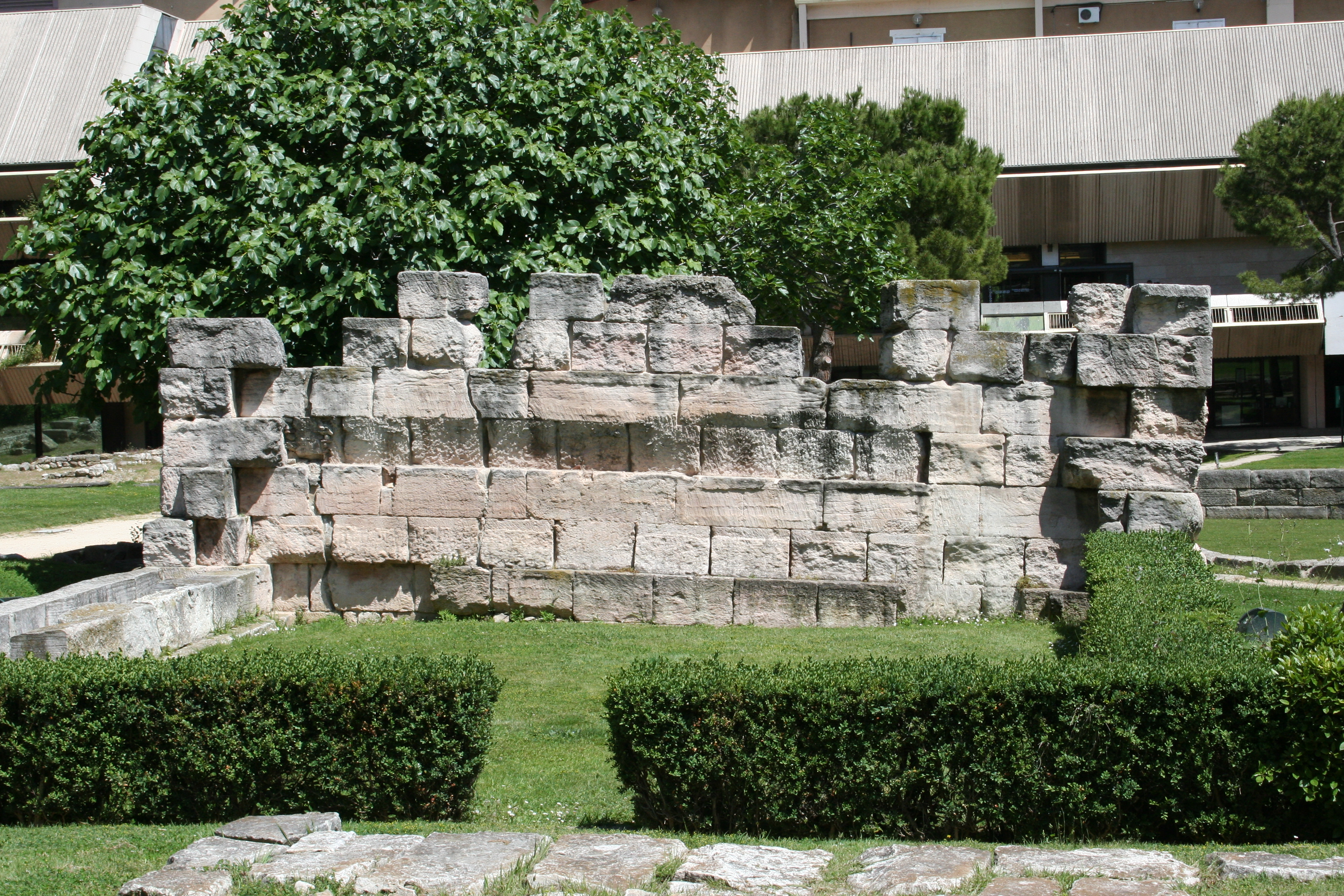
Leaning tower

Discovered in 1913 and classified as a historical monument in 1916, this wall was in the cellar of a house. Some archaeologists of the time thought they had discovered the rampart that Crinas, a wealthy doctor from Marseilles living in Rome, had built at his own expense in the course of the 1st century. This wall is actually older and dates from the 2nd century BC, but nonetheless kept the name. This is the external facing of the rampart, the internal facing having disappeared but being found in the foundations.

=== Defense towers ===
The porte d’Italie was guarded by two towers built to the east of the previous towers of the 4th century BC.

The north tower or square tower, 10.50 m (34.4 ft) wide, is attached to the Wall of Crinas. Some internal blocks bear the marks of quarrymen or stonemasons. The south tower is also called the leaning tower, because its eastern facing has collapsed, the ground being formerly marshy. It was also square, 10.30 m (33.8 ft) wide. Only the eastern facing is preserved. It has two loopholes.

These two towers, which rose to a height of 12 to 15 meters (39 to 49 ft), framed the porte d’Italie. A 22 m-long (72 ft) curtain wall connected the leaning tower to a rectangular tower (7.8 m × 8.4 m [26 ft × 28 ft]). This curtain wall has been rebuilt to give a better idea of this fortification.

=== Forewall ===
In front of the Hellenistic fortifications, rises a front wall in a broken line, rebuilt around the 5th century.

=== Paved way ===
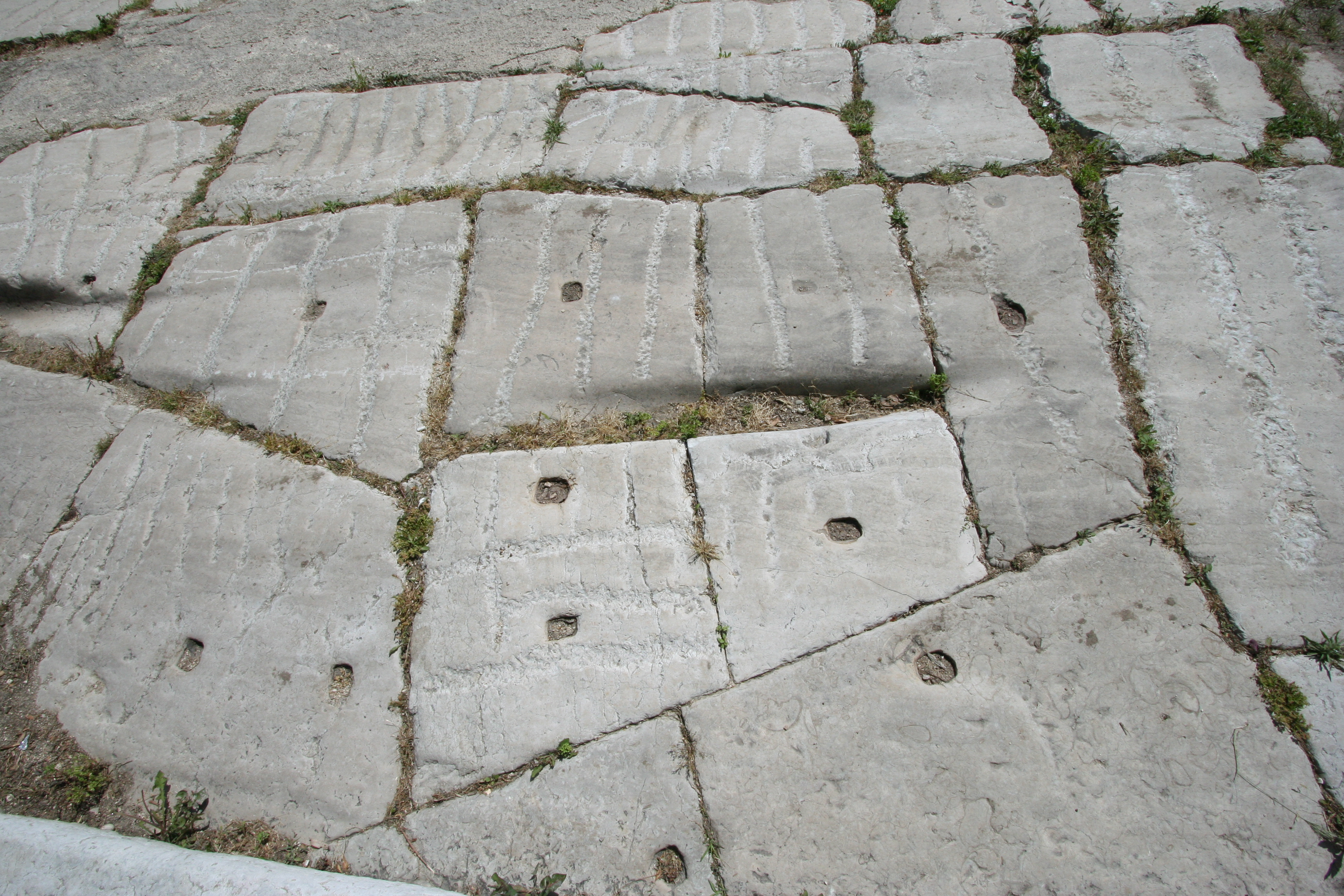
Roman road slabs

The road currently visible presents the last state of its construction in the Later Roman Empire around the 4th century. It was made using large slabs of Cassis stone, very resistant to the traffic of heavy carts. The wide grooves are still visible. They were made to prevent the wheels from slipping, while the holes visible in the middle of the slabs were intended for handling and positioning them. On the edges of the roadway, there is a sidewalk.

=== Freshwater basin ===
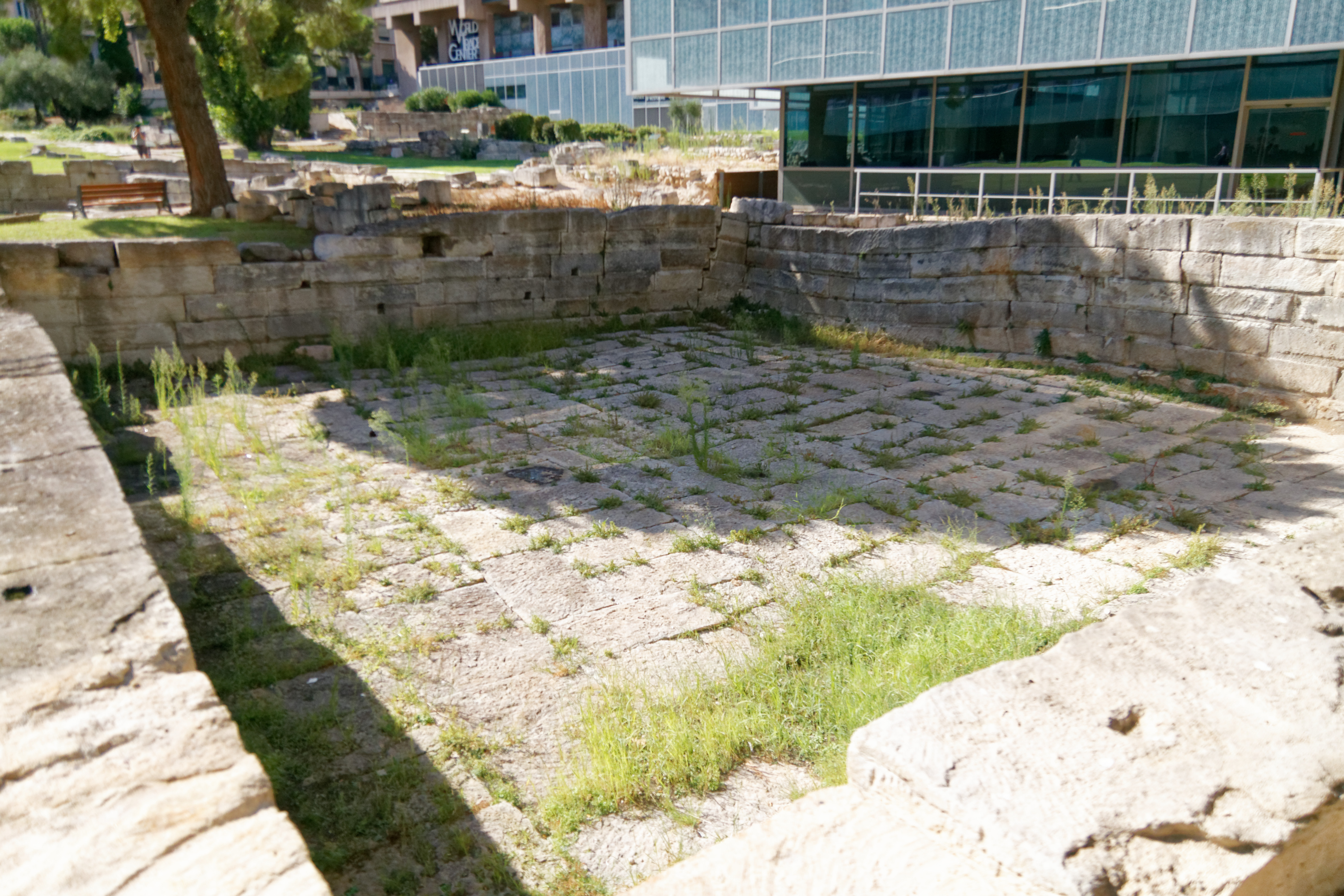
Freshwater basin

To the east of the garden and near the gallery of the Center Bourse is a large square basin made at the beginning of the 2nd century, about 15 m (49 ft) on each side, in well-paired stones, comprising on the whole five courses. The paved bottom was grouted with pitch to ensure watertightness. This basin of nearly 500 mᶟ was supplied with water by a pipe collecting water from a source and emerging in the north-eastern internal side of the basin. This pipeline, which was protected by Cassis stone slabs, was recognized over more than 100 m (330 ft) to the north.

This basin was used to supply water to the boats. On the western internal facing, anchor points and a reserved cavity in the paved ground attest to the existence of a wheel which must have been 3 m (9.8 ft) in diameter, used to clear the alluvium carried by the water. It is likely that another wheel was used to lift the water.

=== Funerary terraces ===
Two funerary enclosures were discovered north of the voie d'Italie. The northernmost one was destroyed in 1973 to make way for the Centre Bourse. Each rectangular enclosure has an area of approximately 100 m^{2} (1,100 sq ft). They were in fact terraces intended to be seen from the voie d'Italie.

The preserved enclosure is decorated with alternating metopes and triglyphs which rest on a plinth. In the center of this terrace a square-shaped plinth was discovered carved from large white limestone: it might have been the base of an altar or statue.

The enclosures were built at the beginning of the 4th century BC. The excavations have revealed several cremations carried out in situ — nineteen in the northern enclosure and six next to the monument with triglyphs. The remains were recovered; they were found in lead, ceramic or bronze urns, which were then placed within stone boxes and arranged in a pit of funerary terraces. Some of these urns are exhibited at the Marseille History Museum. All the tombs date back to the 4th century BC, except for one cremation which might have occurred in the 3rd century BC. At the beginning of the 2nd century, the use of these funerary terraces was abandoned completely and the site covered up with earth.
