= Ameinias of Athens =

5th-century BC Athenian naval commander

Ameinias
- Ἀμεινίας
- Born: Pallene or Decelea or Eleusis
- Relatives: Aeschylus (brother); Cynaegirus (brother); Euphorion (father); Philopatho (sister); Philocles (nephew)
- Military career
- Allegiance: Athens
- Rank: Trireme commander
- Conflicts: Battle of Artemisium; Battle of Salamis
- Awards: Judged to have been the bravest (together with Eumenes) among all the Athenians at the battle of Salamis.

Ameinias or Aminias (Ancient Greek: Ἀμεινίας) was a trireme (Ancient Greek: τριήρης, romanized: triérēs) commander, or trierarch (τριήραρχος, triērarchos), who distinguished himself at the battle of Salamis. Herodotus writes that Ameinias was from the Attic deme of Pallene, while Plutarch writes that he was from Decelea. Diodorus Siculus, perhaps following Ephorus, notes that he is the younger brother of the playwright Aeschylus, which would make his deme Eleusis. This is supported by an anonymous life of Aeschylus. The tenth-century Suda notes that Aeschylus had a brother Amenias who fought at Marathon with his brothers, but does not further identify him with the trierarch. The three claims cannot be reconciled easily, and it is likely that two or more men have been conflated by the sources.

If he was the younger brother of Aeschylus, his father would be Euphorion. He also had a sister, named Philopatho, who was the mother of the Athenian tragic poet Philocles. His brother Aeschylus also fought at Salamis.

According to Diodorus Siculus, Ameinias was the first to ram the flagship of the Persians, sinking it and killing the admiral. Herodotus writes that Athenians claim the engagement started when Ameinias rammed an enemy vessel and his men could not disentangle it, so the other Greek ships joined battle to assist, but the Aeginetans say that one of their ships was the first to attack the Persian fleet. He also pursued the ship of Artemisia, and she escaped by ramming and sinking the ship of her ally Damasithymos. When Ameinias saw that he thought that her ship was Greek and he changed the direction of his Trireme to chase other Persian ships.

Herodotus believed that Ameinias didn't know that Artemisia was on the ship because otherwise he would not have ceased his pursuit until either he had captured her or had been captured himself because orders had been given to the Athenian captains. Moreover, a prize had been offered of ten thousand drachmas for the man who should take her alive, since they thought it intolerable that a woman should lead an expedition against Athens.

In addition, according to Plutarch, Ameinias and Socles of Paeania killed Ariamenes (Herodotus says that his name was Ariabignes), brother of Xerxes and admiral of the Persian navy. When Ariamenes attempted to board their ship, they hit him with their spears and thrust him into the sea.

Ameinias and Eumenes of Anagyrus were judged to have been the bravest on this occasion among all the Athenians. Aelian mentions that Ameinias prevented the condemnation of his brother Aeschylus by the Areopagus.

== See also ==
- Themistocles – Athenian politician and general (c. 524–459 BC)
- Second Persian invasion of Greece – 480–479 BC phase of the Greco-Persian Wars
