= Thessalus of Tralles =

Thessalus of Tralles (fl. circa 70–95 AD) was a famous Roman physician and early adherent to the Methodic school of medicine. He lived in Rome, where he was the court physician of Emperor Nero. It was here that he died and was buried, and his tomb was to be seen on the Via Appia.

He was from Tralles in Lydia. He was the son of a weaver, and followed the same employment himself in his youth. This, however, he soon gave up, and, though he had a poor general education, he embraced the medical profession, by which he acquired for a time a great reputation, and amassed a large fortune. He adopted the principles of the Methodic school, but modified and developed them. He appears to have exalted himself at the expense of his predecessors; asserting that none of them had contributed to the advance of medical science, and boasting that he himself could teach the art of healing in six months. Galen frequently mentions him, but always in terms of contempt, and is often abusive towards him. He is said to have been later overshadowed by Crinas of Marseilles, who was in turn ousted by his fellow countryman Charmis.

He supported a method of treatment that he named metasyncrisis. His object was, in obstinate chronic cases, where other remedies failed, to attempt a thorough change in the fundamental constitution of the organism (syncrisis). He began by the application, for three days, of strong vegetable remedies, both internally and externally, together with which, a strict regimen and emetics were applied. This was the preparation to a system of fasting, which concluded with a course of restoratives.

Thessalus regarded the chicory plant to be an herb of the sun. He wrote several medical works, of which only the titles and a few sentences remain.
