= Philocles =

5th-century BC Athenian tragic poet

- Φιλοκλῆς
- Born: 5th century BC; Athens
- Died: 5th century BC
- Occupation: Poet
- Parent: Philopatho (mother)
- Relatives: Cynaegirus (uncle); Ameinias (uncle); Aeschylus (uncle)

Philocles (Greek: Φιλοκλῆς), was an Athenian tragic poet during the 5th century BC. Through his mother, Philopatho (Greek: Φιλοπαθώ), he had three famous uncles: Aeschylus, the famous poet, Cynaegirus, hero of the battle of Marathon, and Ameinias, hero of the battle of Salamis. The Suda claims that Philocles was the father of the tragic playwright Morsimus, who was in turn the father of the tragedian Astydamas the Elder and was in his turn the father of the tragedian Astydamas the Younger.

== Works ==
According to the Suda, Philocles wrote 100 tragedies. Philocles is best known for winning first prize in the competition against Sophocles' Oedipus Rex. Philocles also wrote a play on the subject of Tereus, which was parodied in Aristophanes' The Birds along with Sophocles' treatment of the same subject. A scholiast has noted that Philocles' Tereus was part of his Pandionis tetralogy. An extant fragment shows that Philocles wrote a play covering the story of Hermione, Neoptolemus and Orestes, a subject also addressed by Euripides in his play Andromache and by Sophocles in his Hermione. In Philocles' version of the Hermione myth, Hermione is betrothed to Neoptolemus by her father Menelaus while she is pregnant with Orestes' child. Philocles also wrote plays entitled Oedipus and Philoctetes. The Suda also names the following as plays of Philocles: Erigone, Nauplius, Oineus, Priam, and Penelope.

== See also ==
- Aeschylus
