= Adeline Rispal =

French architect

- Born: 1955 (age 70–71); Aurillac, Cantal
- Education: École nationale supérieure des Beaux-Arts
- Occupation: Architect
- Awards: Knight of the Order of Agricultural Merit; 2014 Silver Medal Académie d'architecture
- Practice: Ateliers Adeline Rispal; Repérages; Jean Nouvel agency
- Projects: Makkah Museum; Museum of European and Mediterranean Civilisations; French pavilion at Expo 2015
- Website: www.adelinerispal.com

Adeline Rispal (born 1955 in Aurillac) is a French architect, exhibit designer, scenographer and museologist specialising in designing complex cultural and heritage projects.

Rispal was educated at École nationale supérieure des Beaux-Arts at the University of Paris, from where she graduated in 1981.

In 1982, Rispal joined the Jean Nouvel agency where she spent much of her time on the design and museography of the Arab World Institute. In 1990 she co-founded Repérages with Jean-Jacques Raynaud and Louis Tournoux and Jean-Michel Laterrade. In 2010 she founded her own practice, Studio Adeline Rispal.

Rispal was a finalist in the designs for the National September 11 Memorial & Museum in New York in 2007, and the Louvre Abu Dhabi in 2008. The interior of the French pavilion at Expo 2015 in Milan was created by Rispal. Amy Frearson noted in a Dezeen article that this interior was meant to resemble a typical French covered market. In 2016 it was announced that Rispal would work with Mossessian Architecture on the Makkah Museum of the Islamic Faith in Mecca.

A member of the Académie d'architecture, in 2014 Rispal was awarded their Silver Medal. She was made a Knight of the Order of Agricultural Merit for her outstanding service to French agriculture as part of Expo 2015. Rispal is a member of the High Council of Museums of France since 2014.

Since 2013, Rispal has run the cross-disciplinary blog invisibl.eu/, devoted to teaching and disseminating information relating to exhibition architecture.

In 2019, Adeline Rispal co-founded XPO, Fédération des Concepteurs d’Expositions, whose mission is to represent, promote and defend the various trades of exhibition design while advocating for a collaborative and sustainable approach to the design and production.
