= Crinas of Marseilles =

Roman physician

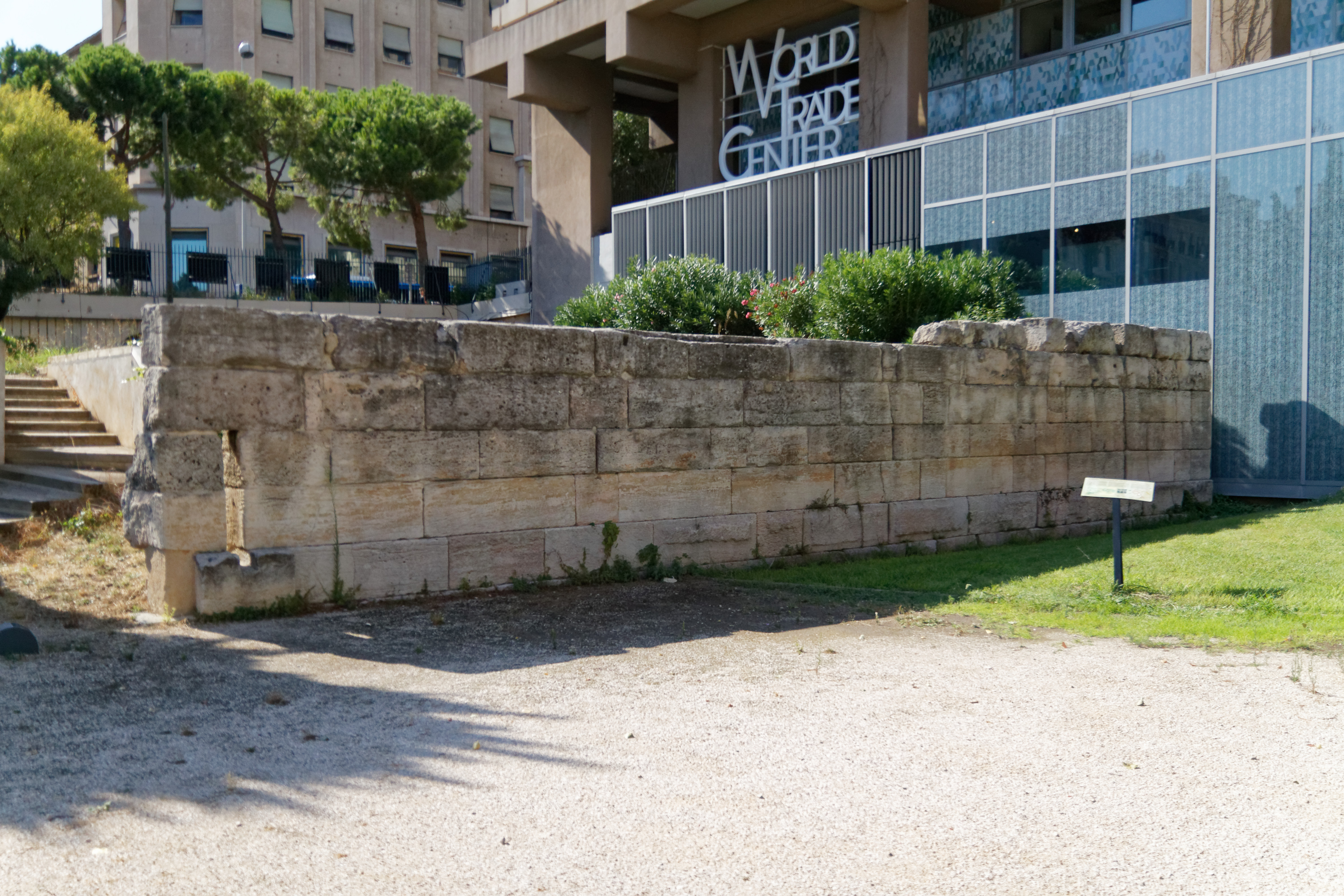
The so-called Wall of Crinas in Marseille

Crinas (Crinias) of Marseilles was a 1st-century physician from Massilia (Marseille), contemporary of the Emperor Nero. He practiced medicine in Massilia, having mathematical and astrological knowledge. What we know about him comes from a few lines of Pliny the Elder in his Natural History, book XXIX, 5 (9).

Having heard of Thessalus of Tralles, who made a great reputation for himself in Rome by practicing the same kind of medicine as himself, Crinas left his hometown to establish himself in Rome to compete with him. Very quickly, by his superior astrology, he diminished the credit of Thessalos by taking away half of his clients. He consulted the stars before prescribing diet and meal times for his patients, according to mathematical tables, which made him pass as more prudent, more learned and more religious than other physicians.

He became so rich that he paid for the fortifications of several cities during his lifetime, and when he died left ten million sesterces to Marseille for its fortifications.

His name is thus associated with the Hellenistic rampart of Marseille (the "Wall of Crinas"), discovered in 1913 near the Bourse, which was believed to have been built thanks to his donations. In fact the enclosure in pink limestone blocks was rebuilt in the middle of the 2nd century BC and Crinas seems to have only helped in its restoration.

A street in the 7th arrondissement of Marseille bears his name.
