= Thessalus (actor) =

Ancient Greek actor

Thessalus was an eminent tragic actor (hypocrites) in the time of Alexander the Great, whose especial favour he enjoyed, and whom he served before his accession to the throne, and afterwards accompanied on his expedition into Asia. He was victor in the Attic Dionysia in 347 and 341, as well as the Lenea. In 340 BC, he acted in the Parthenopaeus of Astydamas.

He acted as the envoy of Alexander to Pixodarus of Caria in 336 BC. Early in 331 BC, he was defeated by the actor Athenodorus, much to Alexander's dismay. Thessalus later performed at the Susa weddings (324 BC).
