= Euphorion (playwright) =

5th-century BC Greek playwright

Euphorion (Ancient Greek: Εὐφορίων, Euphoríōn, fl. 431 BC) was the son of the Greek tragedian Aeschylus, and himself an author of tragedies. He is known solely for his victory over Sophocles and Euripides in the Dionysia of 431 BC. According to the 10th century AD Suda, he won four victories by producing Aeschylus' plays, but it is suggested that this may have been a single victory with four plays.

No work bearing his name survives. He is purported by some to have been the author of Prometheus Bound—previously assumed to be the work of his father, to whom it was attributed at the Library of Alexandria,—for several reasons, chiefly that the portrayal of Zeus in Prometheus Bound is far less reverent than in other works attributed to Aeschylus, and that references to the play appear in the plays of the comic Aristophanes. This has led historians to date it as late as 415 BC, long after Aeschylus's death. If Euphorion wrote Prometheus Bound, then there may be as many as five ancient Greek tragedians with one or more fully surviving plays: Aeschylus, Euphorion, Sophocles, Euripides, and possibly the author of the tragedy Rhesus if its attribution to Euripides is incorrect.
