= 548 BC =

548 BC in various calendars
- Gregorian calendar: 548 BC; DXLVIII BC
- Ab urbe condita: 206
- Ancient Egypt era: XXVI dynasty, 117
- Pharaoh: Amasis II, 23
- Ancient Greek Olympiad (summer): 58th Olympiad (victor)¹
- Assyrian calendar: 4203
- Balinese saka calendar: N/A
- Bengali calendar: −1141 – −1140
- Berber calendar: 403
- Buddhist calendar: −3
- Burmese calendar: −1185
- Byzantine calendar: 4961–4962
- Chinese calendar: 壬子年 (Water Rat); 2150 or 1943 — to — 癸丑年 (Water Ox); 2151 or 1944
- Coptic calendar: −831 – −830
- Discordian calendar: 619
- Ethiopian calendar: −555 – −554
- Hebrew calendar: 3213–3214
- Hindu calendars
- Vikram Samvat: −491 – −490
- Shaka Samvat: N/A
- Kali Yuga: 2553–2554
- Holocene calendar: 9453
- Iranian calendar: 1169 BP – 1168 BP
- Islamic calendar: 1205 BH – 1204 BH
- Javanese calendar: N/A
- Julian calendar: N/A
- Korean calendar: 1786
- Minguo calendar: 2459 before ROC 民前2459年
- Nanakshahi calendar: −2015
- Thai solar calendar: −5 – −4
- Tibetan calendar: ཆུ་ཕོ་བྱི་བ་ལོ་ (male Water-Rat) −421 or −802 or −1574 — to — ཆུ་མོ་གླང་ལོ་ (female Water-Ox) −420 or −801 or −1573

The year 548 BC was a year of the pre-Julian Roman calendar. In the Roman Empire, it was known as year 206 Ab urbe condita. The denomination 548 BC for this year has been used since the early medieval period, when the Anno Domini calendar era became the prevalent method in Europe for naming years.

== Events ==
- Diognetus of Croton wins the stadion race at the Olympic Games.
- The Temple of Apollo at Delphi, Greece is damaged in a fire. The Alcmaeonids rebuild the structure.

== Deaths ==
- Duke Zhuang II, ruler of the Chinese state of Qi
- Megakles II (born 595 BC), Athenian statesman, son of Alkmaion II, grandson of Megakles I, and husband to Agariste of Sicyon
- Thales of Miletus (born c. 626 BC), pre-Socratic Greek philosopher and the first natural philosopher who belonged to the Milesian school along with Anaximander and Anaximenes
