= Cleinias (disambiguation) =

Cleinias (Kleinias) may refer to a number of people from ancient Greek history:

- Members of the Alcmaeonidae family
  - Cleinias, father of the Athenian statesman and general Alcibiades
  - Cleinias, brother of Alcibiades, younger brother of the famous general
- Cleinias, son of Axiochus; he is introduced as a very young man by Plato in the dialogue called Euthydemus
- Cleinias of Tarentum, Pythagorean philosopher
- Cleinias of Croton, tyrant of Croton c. 495 BC
- Cleinias of Sicyon, magistrate of Sicyon c. 270-264 BC, father of Aratus of Sicyon.
- Cleinias of Crete, a cretan lawgiver who appears in Plato's Laws.
