= Epikleros =

Term for an Ancient Greek heiress

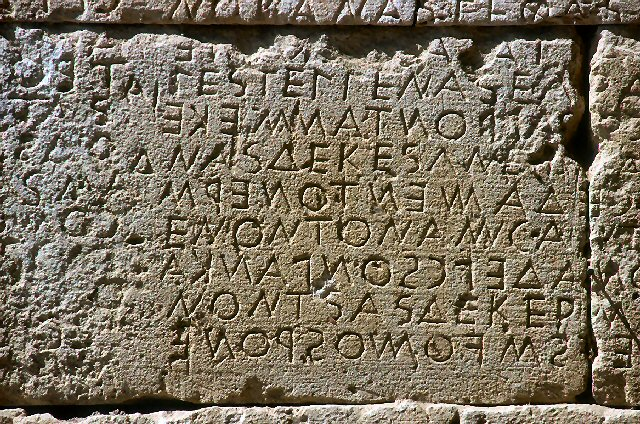
A section of the Gortyn law code inscription, from the 5th century BCE

An epikleros (ἐπίκληρος; pl.: epikleroi) was an heiress in ancient Athens and other ancient Greek city-states, specifically a daughter of a man who had no sons. In Sparta, they were called patrouchoi (πατροῦχοι), as they were in Gortyn. Athenian women were not allowed to hold property in their own name; to keep her father's property in the family, an epikleros was required to marry her father's nearest male relative. Even if a woman was already married, evidence suggests that she was required to divorce her spouse to marry that relative. Spartan women were allowed to hold property in their own right, and so Spartan heiresses were subject to less restrictive rules. Evidence from other city-states is more fragmentary, mainly coming from the city-states of Gortyn and Rhegium.

Plato wrote about epikleroi in his Laws, offering idealized laws to govern their marriages. In mythology and history, a number of Greek women appear to have been epikleroi, including Agariste of Sicyon and Agiatis, the widow of the Spartan king Agis IV. The status of epikleroi has often been used to explain the number of sons-in-law who inherited from their fathers-in-law in Greek mythology. The Third Sacred War originated in a dispute over epikleroi.

== Etymology ==
The term epikleros (a feminine adjective acting as a noun; from the preposition ἐπί, epí, "on, upon", and the noun κλῆρος, klēros, "lot, estate") was used in Ancient Greece to describe the daughter of a man who had died leaving no male heir. It translates to "attached to the family property", or "upon, with the estate". In most ancient Greek city-states, women could not own property, and so a system was devised to keep ownership within the male-defined family line. Epikleroi' were required to marry the nearest relative on their father's side of the family, a system of inheritance known as the epiklerate. Although epikleros is often mistranslated as "heiress", strictly speaking the terms are not equivalent, as the woman never owned the property and so was unable to dispose of it. Raphael Sealey argues that another translation could be "female orphan". The term was used interchangeably, both of the woman herself, and of the property that was the inherited estate. The entire system of the epiklerate was unique to Ancient Greece, and mainly an Athenian institution. (Note: Although the epiklerate resembled the Jewish custom of levirate marriage, it differed in a number of respects, including the fact that a levirate marriage only applied if a woman's spouse died, not if her father or brother died.)

== Athens ==
Athens is the city-state that is best documented, both in terms of epikleroi and in all aspects of legal history. Athenian law on epikleroi was attributed to Solon; women with no brothers had to marry their nearest male relative on their paternal side of the family, starting with their father's brother and moving from there to the next nearest male relative on the paternal side. The historian John Gould notes that the order of relatives that were required to marry the epikleros coincided with the relatives required to avenge a murder. This set of relatives was known as the anchisteia (ἀγχιστεία) in Athens. The anchisteia was also the group of relatives who would inherit property in the absence of legal heirs. If there was more than one possible spouse in a set of relatives, the right to marry the epikleros went to the eldest one. The property that was inherited could also be in debt, which would not affect the epikleros' status.

=== Definition of the term in Athens ===
Although epikleros was most often used in the case of a daughter who had no living brothers when her father died, the term was also used for other cases. The Suda, a 10th-century CE lexicon and encyclopedia, gives other definitions, including an heiress who was married at the time of her father's death and an unmarried daughter without brothers still living with her father. The Suda also stated that the term could be used of a daughter who had living sisters. Although the Suda indicates that in normal usage, the mother of the heiress was also dead, this is incorrect: whether or not the mother was alive had no bearing on the status of the epikleros. Occasionally, the term is also used as a feminine form of the Greek term orphanos, or "orphan". Although a scholiast of Aeschines, or a later writer amending the text, stated that the term could also be used of a daughter who was given to a man in marriage on her father's deathbed, there is no extant use of the term in that sense in literature, and the scholiast has probably misunderstood a scenario from the comic playwright Aristophanes.

The term in Athens seems to have always been somewhat loosely used in legal proceedings. Apollodorus, an Athenian politician and litigant from the 4th century BCE, in one of his speeches attempted to use an Athenian law about betrothal to make his mother an epikleros. He claimed that the law defined an epikleros as a female without a father, a brother who shared a father with her, or a paternal grandfather. His opponent, however, seems to have disputed this interpretation of the law. A speech by Isaeus, a 4th-century BCE speechwriter, rests on the claim that the speaker's mother only became an epikleros after her young brother died following their father's death. Whether the legal authorities recognized the speaker's claim as valid is unknown. It appears, at least according to some plays, that a woman with a brother who died after their father was considered the epikleros of her brother, not her father.

=== Development of the practice ===
It is unclear if there were laws dealing with epikleroi prior to Solon's legislative activity around 594 BCE. According to the 1st century CE writer Plutarch, Solon authored legislation covering the epikleros. Solon's laws attempted to prevent the combination of estates by the marriage of heiresses. Modern historians have seen this as part of an effort by Solon to maintain a stable number of households. According to Plutarch, Solon also legislated that the husband of an epikleros must have sexual intercourse with her at least three times a month to provide her with children to inherit her father's property, but by the time of Pericles (d. 429 BCE) this law is definitely attested. It is unclear whether or not the nearest relative had the power to dissolve an epikleros' previous marriage to marry her himself in all cases. The historian Sarah Pomeroy states that most scholars lean towards the opinion that the nearest relative could only dissolve the previous marriage if the heiress had not yet given birth to a son, but Pomeroy also states that this opinion has not yet been definitely proven. Roger Just disagrees and has argued that even if the epikleros had a son, she could still be forced to marry her nearest relative. Athenian law also required that if the next of kin did not marry the heiress, he had to provide her with a dowry. It may have been Solon who legislated that if the new spouse was unable to fulfill his thrice-monthly duties to his wife, she was entitled to have sex with his next of kin so that she could produce an heir to her father's property. Alternatively, she might have been required to divorce and marry the next nearest relative.

=== Legal procedures ===
When a man died leaving an epikleros, the heiress was felt to be epidikos, or as it literally translates, "adjudicable". This made her available for the specialized procedure for the betrothal of an epikleros, a type of court judgement called epidikasia. (Note: The epidikasia was one of three ways in which a legitimate marriage might be contracted in Classical Athens.) The proceedings took place in the archon's court, for citizen epikleroi. For the epikleroi of resident aliens in Athens, the metics, the polemarch was in charge of their affairs. It was also the case that if a man made a will, but did not give any of his daughters their legal rights as epikleroi in the will, then that will was held to be invalid. A young Athenian male, prior to coming of age and serving his time as an ephebe, or military trainee, was allowed to claim epikleroi, the only legal right an ephebe was permitted in Aristotle's day, besides that of taking office as a priest in an hereditary priesthood. It is also unclear if a man who was eligible to marry an epikleros but was already married could keep his previous wife while also claiming the epikleros. While all evidence points to the ancient Athenians being monogamous, there are two speeches by Demosthenes implying that men did indeed have both a wife acquired through the normal betrothal procedure and another who was adjudicated to them through the epidikasia (ἐπιδικασία) procedure. The archon was also responsible for overseeing the treatment of epikleroi, along with widows, orphans, widows who claimed to be pregnant, and households that were empty.

When sons of an epikleros came of age, they gained the ownership of the inheritance. In Athens, this age was given in an extant law, and was two years past the age of puberty of the son. In Solon's laws, it appears that the eldest son of the epikleros was considered the heir of his maternal grandfather, with any further sons being considered part of their father's household. The son's inheritance of his maternal grandfather's property happened whether or not his father and mother were alive, unlike most other inheritances. And the son of an epikleros did not inherit anything from his father, and was named after his grandfather. The heir could further consolidate his position by being posthumously adopted by his maternal grandfather, but this was not required. By the 4th century BCE, legal practices had changed, and the son could also inherit from his father, as well as from his maternal grandfather. And if there was more than one son, they divided the estate passed by the epikleros between themselves. After the heir secured possession of his inheritance, the law specified that he was to support his mother. It is likely that the debts of the grandfather were also inherited along with any property.

Although the law did not rule on who exactly owned the property before the son took possession, it appears from other sources that it was not actually owned by the husband of the epikleros, in contrast to the usual procedure in Athens, where the husband owned any property of the wife and could do with it as he willed. A number of speeches imply that the property was considered to be owned by the epikleros herself, although she had little ability to dispose of it. The husband probably had day-to-day control of the property and administered it, but was responsible for the management of the epikleros' heirs when they came of age. The position of the husband of an epikleros was closest to that of an epitropos, or the guardian of an orphan's property, who was likewise responsible to the orphan for his care of the property when the orphan came of age. Another parallel with the orphan was that an epikleros' property was exempt from liturgies (leitourgiai), or the practice of requiring citizens to perform public tasks without compensation, as was the orphan's.

It may have been possible for the husband of an epikleros to allow the posthumous adoption of the son of an epikleros as the son of the epikleros' father. This would prevent the inheritance of the newly adopted son of any property from his natural father, but it had the advantage of preserving the adoptee's oikos, commonly translated as "household" but incorporating ideas of kinship and property also. Although the preservation of the paternal oikos is usually felt to be the reason behind the whole practice of the epiklerate, the historian David Schaps argues that in fact, this was not really the point of the practice. Instead, he argues, it was the practice of adoption that allowed the preservation of an oikos. Schaps feels that the reason the epiklerate evolved was to ensure that orphaned daughters were married. Other historians, including Sarah Pomeroy, feel that the children of an epikleros were considered to transmit the paternal grandfather's oikos. The historian Cynthia Patterson agrees, arguing that adoption may have seemed unnecessary, especially if the epikleros and her husband gave their son the name of the maternal grandfather. She argues that too much attention has been paid to the patrilineal aspects of the oikos, and that there was probably less emphasis on this in actual Athenian practice and more on keeping a household together as a productive unit.

The historian Roger Just states the main principle of the epiklerate was that no man could become the guardian of the property without also becoming the husband of the epikleros. Just uses this principle to claim that any man adopted by the father of an epikleros was required to marry the epikleros. Just states that the forcible divorce and remarriage of an epikleros was based on this principle, arguing that if the father of the epikleros had not adopted the first husband, the husband was not really the heir. Just sees the development of the epiklerate as flowing from Solon's desire to keep the number of Athenian households constant. According to Just, before Solon's legislation, the epikleros was just treated as part of the property, but Solon's reforms transformed the epikleros into a transmitter of the property and her son the automatic heir to her father's estate.

Taking as a wife an epikleros who had little estate was considered a praiseworthy action, and was generally stressed in public speeches. Such an heiress was called an epikleros thessa. If the nearest male relative did not wish to marry an epikleros who belonged to the lowest income class in Athens, he was required to find her a husband and provide her with a dowry on a graduated scale according to his own income class. This dowry was in addition to her own property, and the requirement was designed to ensure that even poor heiresses found husbands. The law also did not stipulate what was to happen if the epikleros was still an infant or too young for consummation of the marriage when she was claimed.

=== Sequence of the anchisteia ===
The first set of relatives that had a claim to an epikleros were the paternal uncles and any heirs of the uncles. Next in line were any sons of the sisters of the father and any of their heirs. Third in line were the grandsons of the father's paternal uncles, and following them the grandsons of the paternal aunts of the father. After these paternal relatives were exhausted, then the half-brothers of the father by the same mother were in line, then the sons of the maternal half-sisters of the father. Seventh in line were the grandsons of maternal uncles of the father, and then the grandsons of maternal aunts of the father. It appears that if there were two or more relatives that were related in the same degree, the eldest of the similarly-related relatives had priority in claiming the epikleros. (Note: This was unusual in Athenian law, as no other legal process gave priority to age.)

=== Chances of becoming an epikleros ===
Modern estimates of the odds of an Athenian woman becoming an epikleros say that roughly one out of seven fathers died without biological sons. However, Athenian law allowed for a man to adopt another male as a son in his will, so not all daughters without brothers would have become epikleroi. Most modern historians estimate that 20 percent of families would have had only daughters, and another 20 percent would have been childless. The modern historian Cynthia Patterson said of the epikleros that although "she was distinctive, she was not rare".

=== Already married epikleroi ===
Whether an epikleros who was married at the time of her father's death was required to divorce her current spouse and marry the anchisteus (next-of-kin) is unclear. Most modern historians have come to the conclusion that this was only required if the epikleros had not yet had a son that could inherit the grandfather's estate. The clearest evidence is from the Roman playwright Terence, in his play Adelphoe, which includes a plot element involving a claim that a girl is actually an epikleros. Although the play was written in the 2nd century BCE, Terence adapted most of his plays from earlier Athenian comedies, which makes it slightly more reliable as a source. And common sense argues that if a son had already been born to an epikleros, there was no need to parcel out the epikleros to a relative to provide a male heir to the grandfather's estate. Although the anchisteus had the right to marry the epikleros, he was not required to do so, and could refuse the match or find another spouse for the heiress. It was also possible for the husband of an epikleros, who was not her anchisteus, to buy off the anchisteus to remain married to his wife. Such cases were alleged by the speaker of Isaeus' speech 10 as well as a character in Menander's play Aspis.

== Other city-states ==
Evidence for other ancient city states is more scattered and fragmentary.

=== Sparta ===
In ancient Sparta, women had extensive rights, including the right to inherit property and to manage their own and their spouse's property. In Sparta the law of epikleros only applied to unmarried girls, and the Spartan kings were responsible for finding spouses for epikleroi who had not been betrothed before their father's death. Herodotus, in his list of Spartan royal prerogatives, said: "The kings are the sole judges of these cases only: concerning an unmarried heiress, to whom it pertains to have [her], if her father has not bethrothed her", but the exact meaning of this statement is debated. Some historians have interpreted this to mean that the kings had the right to give the heiress to anyone they chose, but others have suggested that the kings merely had the right to bestow the heiress on the nearest male relative, or to arbitrate between competing claims. Another suggestion is that the king's choice was restricted to citizens who had no land. The name given to these heiresses in Sparta was patrouchoi or patroiouchoi, which literally translates as "holders of the patrimony. They inherited the land themselves, and retained the right to dispose of their inherited property. There were no restrictions on who they might marry.

By the 4th century BCE, Aristotle records that there were no restrictions on whom an heiress might marry. If she was not married during her father's lifetime or by directions in her father's will, her nearest next-of-kin was allowed to marry her wherever he chose.

=== Gortyn ===
In Gortyn, epikleroi were also called patroiokoi, and they were more generously treated than in Athens. The term patroiokos can be literally translated as "having the father's property", and was a description of the condition of the heiress. She was considered a patroiokos if she had no father or brother by her father living. The relative who had the right to marry her was called an epiballon, and the list of who was eligible for that status was also limited to just her paternal uncles and the sons of those uncles. If there were no candidates fitting those conditions, the patroiokos was free to marry as she chose. If she wished, a patroiokos could free herself from the obligation to marry her nearest relative by paying him part of her inheritance. If her nearest relative did not wish to marry her, she was free to find a spouse in her tribe, or if none was willing, then she could marry whomever she wished. Gortyn may owe the liberality of its heiress laws to the fact that it was one of the few city-states known to have allowed daughters to inherit even if they had brothers; daughters in Gortyn received half the share of a son. To prevent the abuse of the system, there was a time limit on the right of the closest epiballon to marry her, and if the limit expired, the right passed to the next nearest epiballon until the patroiokos was either married or ran out of possible epiballontes. There was a limit, however, that a man could only marry one heiress. Unlike in Athens, the heiress owned her inheritance, and her son did not inherit until she died. Her son was also eligible to inherit from his father.

=== Others ===
Rhegium owed its laws on epikleroi to Androdamas of Rhegium, a law-giver whose views on this subject were especially esteemed, according to Aristotle. In the city-state of Charondas' laws, an epikleros had to be given a dowry if her nearest kin did not wish to marry her. During the time of Alexander the Great, Tegean law deals with the inheritance of returning exiles, limiting them to inheriting only their paternal estate or an estate of their mother if she had become an epikleros while in exile. The city-states of Naupactus and Thermus allowed women to inherit property, but whether or not the daughters were considered epikleroi is unknown from the surviving fragments of the laws from those cities.

== Plato ==
Plato, in his Laws, set forth rules that governed not the ideal state, which he described in The Republic, but what he felt might be obtainable in the real world. Included amongst them were some dealing with inheritance and heiresses. In general outline, they conformed to Athenian practice, with the daughter of a man who died without male heirs becoming an epikleros. Plato gave rules governing who the husband of the epikleros might be, and said that the inherited plot might not be divided or added to another plot. The main departure from Athenian law came if there was no direct heir, and the inheritance go to collateral relations. In that case, Plato assigned the inheritance not to one person, but to a pair, one male and one female, and ordered that they must marry and provide an heir to the estate, much like the epikleros.

== Later history ==
In 318 BCE, Cassander appointed Demetrius Phalereus to govern the city-state of Athens. Demetrius issued a set of laws that are known from later literary works. Although knowledge of these laws is fragmentary, it does not appear that Demetrius legislated anything on the subject of epikleroi. This is in striking contrast to Solon's legislation, which was concerned with the internal affairs of the family and its external manifestations in public life. By the 4th century BCE, the practice of the epiklerate was falling into disuse, and it disappeared during the Hellenistic Period, although it continued to appear in New Comedy and scattered inscriptions from the 3rd century BCE, if dated correctly, refer to occasional epikleroi. One method that developed to avoid the epiklerate was through the adoption of a son by the father of a possible epikleros.

== Noted epikleroi ==
=== In mythology ===
In the tales of heroic Greece, royal succession often passed from father-in-law to son-in-law, and some historians have seen in this an early example of the epikleros pattern. Some examples include Pelops, Bellerophon, Melampus, Peleus, Telamon, and Diomedes. Not all such heroic era royal successions followed the epikleros pattern however, as in the case of Menelaus, who married Helen of Troy and succeeded Helen's father Tyndareus, even though Tyndareus had living sons, Kastor and Polydeukes. Another example is Arete of Phaeacia in the Odyssey, who was an heiress married to her father's brother Alcinous.

=== Historical examples ===
Aristotle related that the revolt of Mytilene against Athens in 428 BCE originated in a dispute over epikleroi. The Sacred War of 356–346, between Thebes and Phocis, was also started by a disagreement over epikleroi. It is likely that Agariste, the daughter of Cleisthenes of Sicyon who married Megacles of Athens, was an epikleros. Likewise, the widow of the Spartan king Agis IV, Agiatis, was forced to marry Cleomenes, the son of the man who had executed Agis, King Leonidas II. Plutarch stated that the reason Leonidas married Agiatis to Kleomenes was that Agiatis was a patrouchos from her father, Gylippos. Another Spartan example may have been Gorgo, the only daughter of King Cleomenes I, who was married to Cleomenes' brother Leonidas I.

Kallisto, the granddaughter of the Athenian orator Lykourgos, was an epikleros after the deaths of her grandfather, paternal uncles Habron and Lykourgos, and father Lykophron. She was married and had a son, whom her father adopted and renamed Lykophron. After her father's adoption of her son, Kallisto's husband, son, and father all died, leaving her father's household in danger of extinction. Her second marriage, however, produced a son who continued the household. Demosthenes' mother Cleoboule was the epikleros of Gylon.

Other possible epikleroi include the daughters of Polyeuctus, who managed to remain married to their spouses even after becoming epikleroi. Meidylides' daughter was an heiress, and her father tried to marry her to her anchisteia, but the prospective husband refused the match, and the daughter was married to a non-relative instead.

=== Literary examples ===
In literature, Antigone, the daughter of Oedipus, would be considered an epikleros, and her uncle Creon would have been responsible for her marriage as well as that of her sister Ismene. The marriage of an epikleros also is part of the plot for Menander's play Aspis. (Note: Menander also wrote two plays, now lost, with the title Epikleros, at least one of which was translated into Latin.) In Euripides' play Ion, Erechtheus's daughter Creusa is an epikleros whose status allows her son Ion to become a citizen of Athens. Alexis, Antiphanes, Diodorus, Diphilus, Euetes, and Heniokhos all wrote comedies titled Epikleros, although none are extant. Three more comedies were titled Epidikazmenos, or "the man to whom an estate is adjudged" – these were by Diphilus, Philemon and Apollodorus of Carystus. Two surviving Latin comedies by Terence were based on Greek plays dealing with heiresses: the Phormio, which is based on Apollodorus' Epidikazmenos; and the Adelphoe, which is based on Menander's play Adelphoi.

A speech of Andocides indirectly concerns epikleroi, as the orator claimed that the real origin of the dispute between himself and his cousin Leagros was over which of them would claim an heiress that both were related to. Demosthenes' speech Against Macartatus includes a description of Sositheos' claiming of the epikleros Phulomakhe.

== See also ==
- Endogamy
- Exogamy
