= Pericles the Younger =

Athenian general (440s–406 BC)

Pericles the Younger (440s – 406 BCE) was an ancient Athenian strategos (general), the illegitimate son of famous Athenian leader Pericles by Aspasia.

Pericles the Younger was probably born in the early to mid 440s BCE, before 446 according to some scholars, but possibly as late as 440. He was admitted to Athenian citizenship by a special exception from his father's own law prohibiting citizenship to children of non-Athenian mothers. He served as Hellenotamias in 410 or 409, and as strategos in 406. He was one of six strategoi executed following the Battle of Arginusae for failing to pick up survivors in a storm (see Battle of Arginusae#Trial of the generals).

== Ancestry ==
Ancestors of Pericles the Younger

8. Ariphron
4. Xanthippus
2. Pericles
20. Megacles
10. Hippocrates
21. Agariste of Sicyon
5. Agariste
1. Pericles the Younger
6. Axiochus
3. Aspasia
