= Agarista =

Agarista may refer to:

- Alternative spelling of Agariste, a name from Greek mythology
- Agarista (moth), a genus of moths in the family Noctuidae
- Agarista (plant), a genus of plants in the family Ericaceae
