= Alcmaeonidae =

Powerful family in Ancient Athens

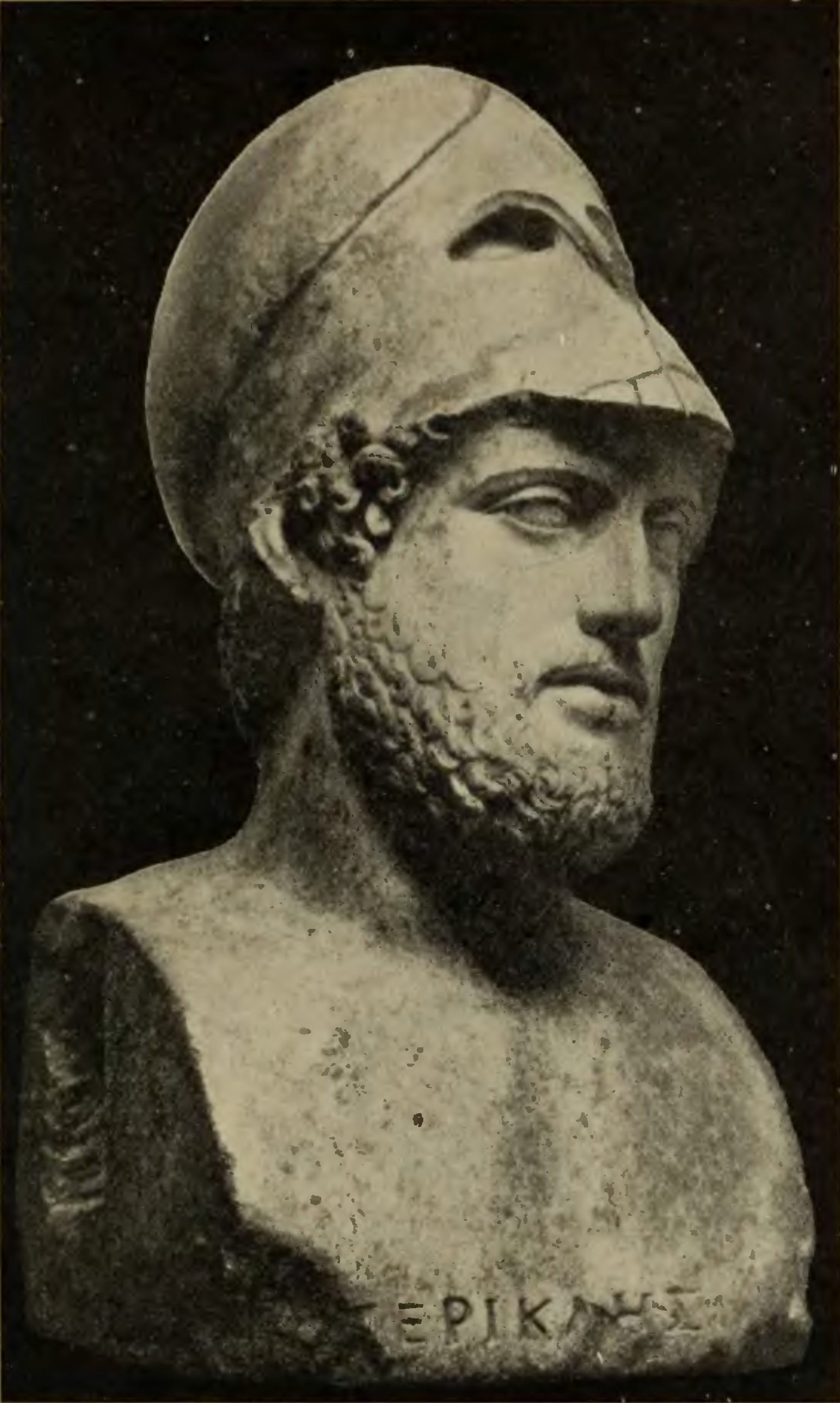
Bust of Pericles in the British Museum, Roman copy of a lost Greek original. One of the most famous Alcmaeonidae, Pericles was an Athenian general, orator, and statesman.

The Alcmaeonidae (/ˌælk.miː.ˈɒn.ɪd.iː/; Ancient Greek: Ἀλκμαιωνίδαι, Alkmaionidai; Attic: Ἀλκμεωνίδαι, Alkmeonidai) or Alcmaeonids (/ˌælk.miː.ˈoʊ.nɪdz/) were a wealthy and powerful noble family of ancient Athens, a branch of the Neleides who claimed descent from the mythological Alcmaeon, the great-grandson of Nestor.

In the 7th to late 5th centuries BC, the Alcmaeonidae played a significant role in the developments and events that occurred in Athens. Such developments included overthrowing an Athenian tyrant, helping to lay the foundations of Athenian democracy, and having generals for Athens during the Peloponnesian War. The Alcmaeonidae were mentioned frequently throughout Herodotus' The Histories, and many played a key role in shaping Athens. The first prominent Alcmaeonid was Megacles, who was exiled from the city and given a curse on him and his family. Furthermore, there was Cleisthenes, who became known as "the father of Athenian democracy" by numerous scholars and historians. Another famous Alcmaeonid was Pericles, whom Thucydides would later call "the first citizen of Athens," as well as Alcibiades, who switched sides numerous times during the Peloponnesian War, and would end up being the last of the notable Alcmaeonidae. The main aristocratic rival of the Alcmaeonidae in the 6th and 5th centuries BC were the Peisistratids.

== Early background and history ==
Unlike many aristocratic families at the time, the Alcmaeonidae were not named after a mythological founder, but rather from a historical figure. In this case, the founder was Alcmaeon, father of Megacles. Similar to other aristocratic families however, was that the Alcmaeonidae did employ the tradition of reusing the name of the maternal or paternal grandfather in the family. As a result, there are numerous Megacles, Alcmaeon, and Cleisthenes names in this family. The first noteworthy Alcmaeonid was Megacles, son of Alcmaeon, who was the Archon Eponymous of Athens in the 7th century BC.

=== Cylonian Affair ===
As the Chief Archon during the Cylonian Affair (c. 632 BC), Megacles violated the sacred laws of suppliants by murdering Cylon's followers. Cylon, an Olympic victor, attempted a coup, and his followers sought sanctuary at the altar of Athena on the Acropolis. Megacles promised them safety during their trial, but once they left the altar, he had them murdered. This violated the sacred laws of suppliants (hikesia). The resulting curse (miasma or agos) was a tangible concept of religious defilement that was believed to cling to Megacles and his descendants, the Alcmaeonids. Megacles, along with his family was exiled, to the point where buried Alcmaeonidae bodies were dug up and removed from the city limits.

Still bearing the weight of the familial “curse”, Alcmaeon sought to restore his family's name and authority. An opportunity would arise when Croesus, the famously wealthy King of Lydia, sought Greek intermediaries between himself and the Oracle of Delphi. Alcmaeon would be chosen as an ambassador between Croesus and the religious site. Alcmaeon was rewarded for a successful mission and was allowed to “take as much gold as he could carry”, leading to the myth of “gold stuffing” that would permeate within the Alcmaeonidae family. This provided financial and political capital paving the way for Alcmaeonids to return to prominence in Athens.

=== Rivalry with Peisistratids ===
During the tyranny of Pisistratus, a member of the influential Peisistratids family, and rival clan to the Alcmaeonidae, the aforementioned Megacles married his daughter to the tyrant. The tyrant, however, refused to have children with her, and Megacles along with his allies banished him. Later the Alcmaeonids would claim to have been exiled following Pisistratus' return in 546 BC, so as to distance themselves from possible accusations of complicity, but epigraphic evidence in fact proves that Cleisthenes was archon for the year 525–24 BC. Megacles was able to marry (for a second or third time) Agarista, the daughter of the tyrant Cleisthenes of Sicyon. They had two sons, Hippocrates and another Cleisthenes, this one the reformer of Athenian democracy. Hippocrates' daughter was Agariste, the mother of Pericles.

== Contributions to Athenian democracy: Cleisthenes ==
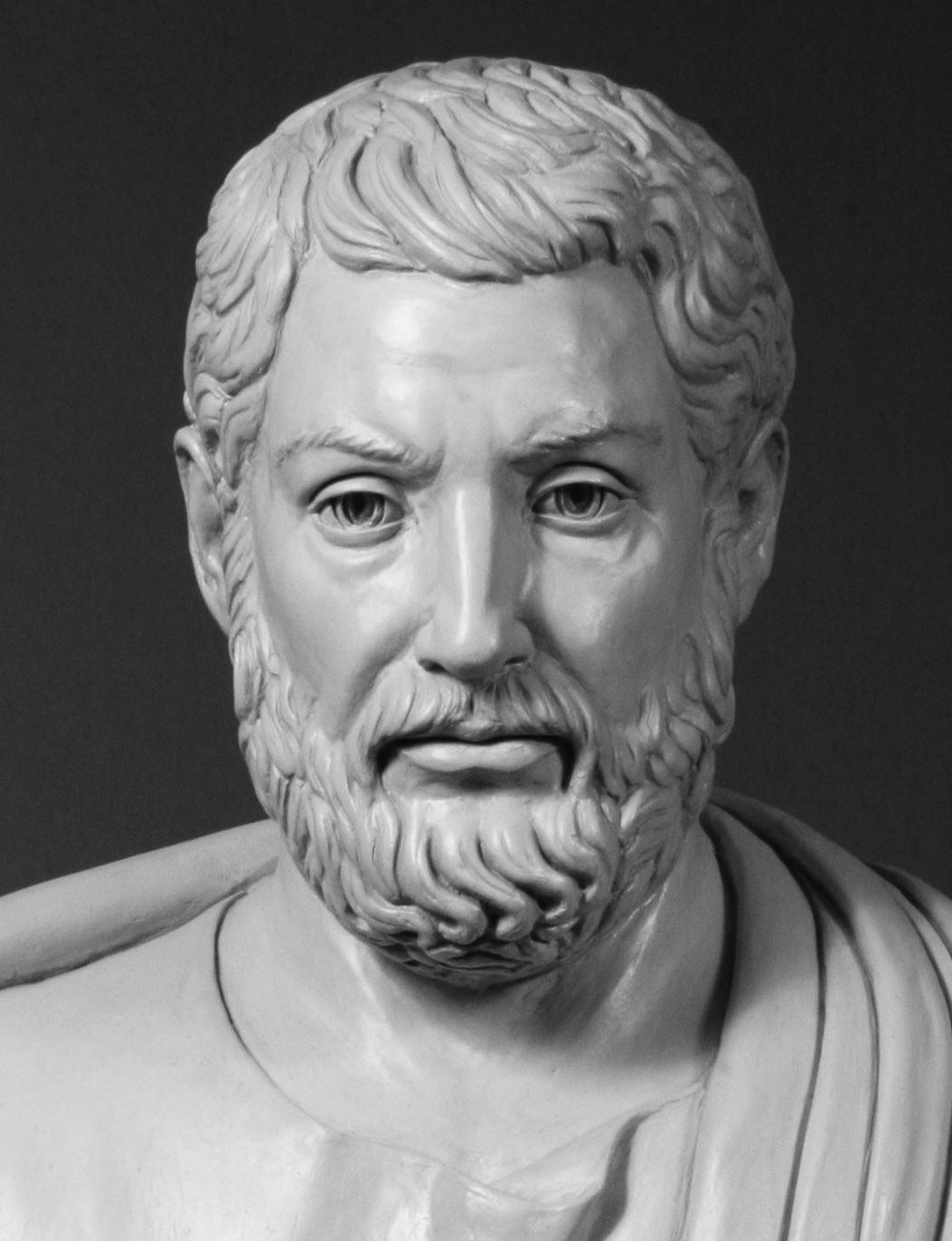
Modern bust of Cleisthenes in the Ohio Statehouse. Another prominent Alcmaeonid, Cleisthenes is credited as being "the father of Athenian democracy."

The Alcmaeonid Cleisthenes overthrew Hippias, the son and successor of Pisistratus, in 508 BC. Herodotus claimed in his The Histories that the Alcmaeonidae specifically hated tyranny, and that they were more esteemed and highly honored than any other clan for ridding Athens from it. Cleisthenes had bribed the oracle at Delphi (which the Alcmaeonidae had helped to build while they were in exile) to convince the Spartans to help him, which they reluctantly did. He was, at first, opposed by some who felt the famous curse made the Alcmaeonidae ineligible to rule; the Spartan king Cleomenes I even turned against Cleisthenes and the latter was briefly exiled once more. However, the citizens called for Cleisthenes to return, as Cleisthenes achieved support from the masses due to his calls for a more democratic system against his rival Isagoras, thus giving more power to the people, and the restored Alcmaeonids were responsible for laying the foundations of Athenian democracy.

A few of the contributions that the Alcmaeonid Cleisthenes helped develop in Athens included the shifting of political organization from the four traditional tribes, which were based on family relations and which formed the basis of the upper class Athenian political power network, into ten tribes according to their area of residence (their deme), which would form the basis of a new democratic power structure. Additionally, through Cleisthenes' reforms, the people of Athens endowed their city with isonomic institutions—equal rights for all citizens (though only men were citizens)—and established ostracism as a punishment. He also established sortition—the random selection of citizens to fill government positions rather than kinship or heredity, a true test of real democracy. He reorganized the Boule, created with 400 members under Solon, so that it had 500 members, 50 from each tribe. He also introduced the bouletic oath, "To advise according to the laws what was best for the people". Scholars have credited Cleisthenes with "completing (Athenian) democracy", taking the reforms of his predecessors and expanding upon them to further ensure Athenians could coexist with one another and thus abandoning separatist traditions.

== Later years: Pericles and Alcibiades ==
The Alcmaeonidae were said to have negotiated for an alliance with the Persians during the Persian Wars, despite the fact that Athens was leading the resistance to the Persian invasion. In Herodotus' The Histories, the Alcmaeonidae were accused of sending a shield as a warning signal for the Persians, something that Herodotus, in his opinion, refused to believe that the Alcmaeonidae could be traitors to Athens. In addition, many scholars have debated over the veracity of the story of the shield signal, some believing that it was a ploy to slander the Alcmaeonidae, others that it was just a tale that had gained traction and had no truth.

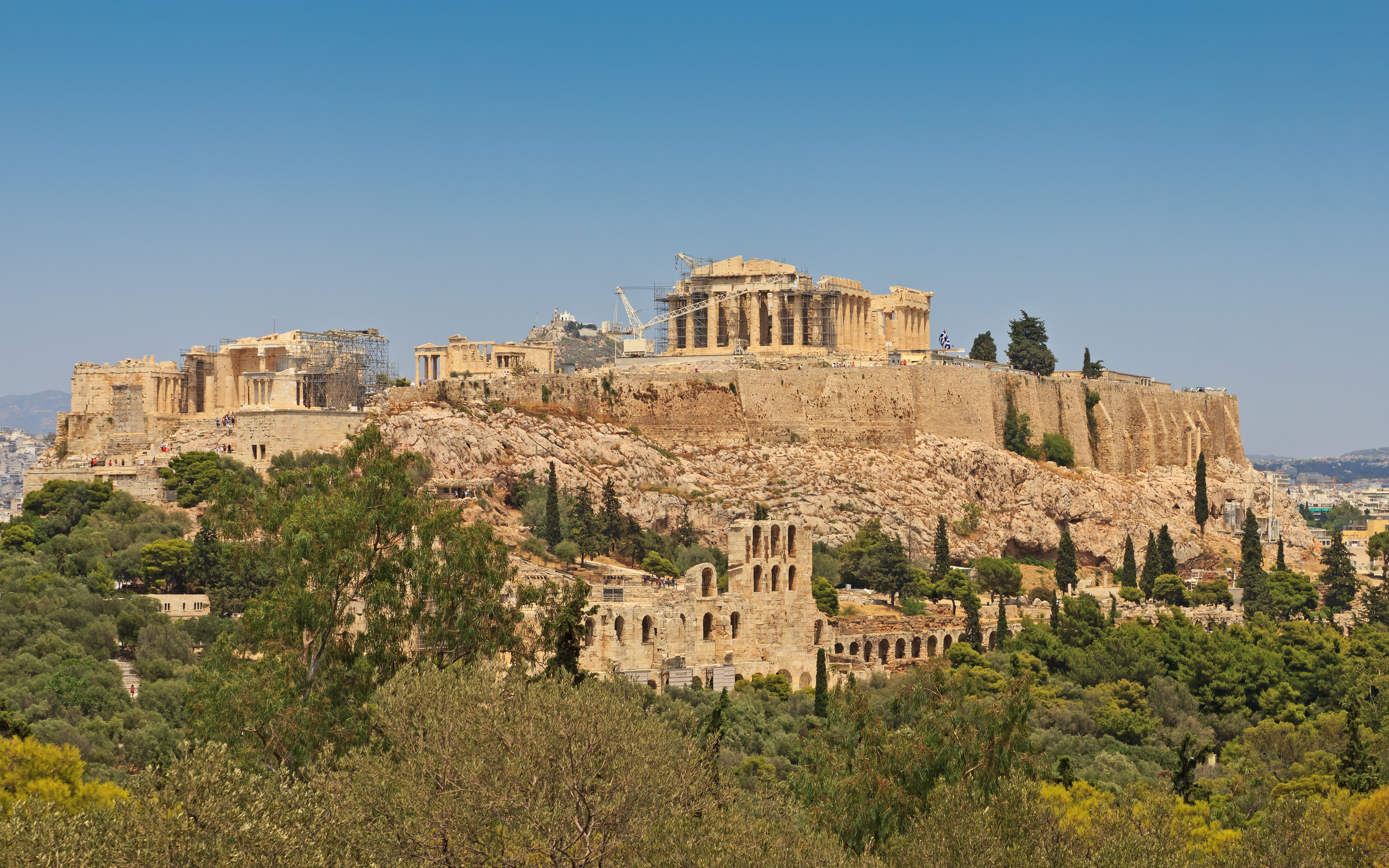
View of the Acropolis of Athens from Philopappos Hill

Pericles and Alcibiades also belonged to the Alcmaeonidae, and during the Peloponnesian War the Spartans referred to the family's curse in an attempt to discredit Pericles. Pericles led Athens from roughly 461 to 429 BC, in what is sometimes referred to as the "Age of Pericles." He is credited in part for the transformation of Athens into an empire through the Delian League. Pericles promoted the arts and literature, and it is principally through his efforts that Athens acquired the reputation of being the educational and cultural center of the ancient Greek world. He started an ambitious project that generated most of the surviving structures on the Acropolis, including the Parthenon. This project beautified and protected the city, exhibited its glory, and gave work to its people. Pericles' Funeral Oration is nowadays synonymous with the struggle for participatory democracy and civic pride. He eventually would succumb to the Plague of Athens that ran rampant during this time, killing numerous people.

Alcibiades was a prominent orator, general, and statesman of Athens as well; however, he would end up switching sides from Athens to Sparta several times during the Peloponnesian War. He was an aggressive advocate for the Sicilian Expedition, and eventually fled to Sparta after accusations of sacrilege. He was characterized as "prone to be led away into pleasure" and was often criticized for "that lawless self-indulgence". However, Alcibiades was also seen as an invincible general and wherever he went, victory would follow; had he led the army in Sicily, the Athenians would have avoided disaster and, had his countrymen followed his advice at Aegospotami, Lysander would have lost and Athens would have ruled Greece. Alcibiades also tried to ally with the Persians after he was accused of impiety, but Thucydides claims this was due to him wanting to be restored in Athens by the Persians. Ultimately failing to achieve this goal. Having been one of the last few notable statesman, Alcibiades's family would eventually disappear from prominence after the defeat of Athens in the Peloponnesian War.

== Family tree ==
As a result of a family tradition for naming descendants after their forebears, members of the family can easily be confused. Hence, what follows is a partial family tree of the historical Alcmaeonid family. Males are in blue, females in red, and those related by marriage in white.

Family of Alcmaeonidae

Alcmaeon
Megacles
Alcmaeon
Megacles
Alcmaeon	Cleisthenes of Sicyon
Megacles	Agariste of Sicyon
Cleisthenes	Hippocrates	Ariphron
Alcibiades	Megacles	Agariste	Xanthippus
Axiochus	Cleinias	Deinomache	Euryptolemus	Ariphron	Aspasia	Pericles	[Unknown] (Note: The name of Pericles' wife is unknown. She was a close relation, possibly a cousin. Robert Cromey argues that she was Deinomache, the mother of Alcibiades, but Debra Nails argues that this is chronologically impossible.)	Hipponicus III
Cleinias	Alcibiades	Cleinias	Isodice	Cimon	Pericles II	Paralus	Xanthippus	Callias III
Alcibiades

== In literature ==
=== Ancient Greece narratives ===
The majority of premodern text surrounding the Alcmaeonids can be found in Herodotus' Histories: with the curse being discussed in Book 1 Chapters 59–64; Alcmaeon and the "gold stuffing" myth in Book 6 Chapters 125–131; Cleisthenes in Book 5 Chapters 66–73, and Book 6 Chapter 131; Pericles and the Persian War in Book 6: Chapters 115–124,131. There is other text from later on in Ancient Greece that discusses the Alcmaeonids including: Aristotle's Athenaion Politeia in parts 19–22, where he mainly focuses on the political reforms of the Alcmaeonids; Thucydides' History of the Peloponnesian War Book 1 126–145, where he focuses on the political landscape and Pericles response to Athenian criticisms, and in Book 2 13–17, Thucydides details how Pericles navigated his way through domestic finances, and war strategies; whereas in Book 2 34-46 Pericles gives a eulogy not just to the dead but takes the opportunity to celebrate Athens and inspire his men; finally in the History of the Peloponnesian War Book 2 55–65, Pericles' last speech and Thucydides' own eulogy for Pericles are narrated. Mentions of the various myths and specific persons are also found in other Greek writings: including The Orators Against Alcibiades I; Plato's First Alcibiades; and Aristophanes's comedies where he mocked Alcibiades.

=== Modern writings ===
Much of the scholarship surrounding the Alcamaeonids in the last half century focuses on the political landscape of Ancient Greece and use the Alcmaeonids as examples of bribing, and political exile in early Greece. Individual persons such as Pericles, Cleisthenes, and Megacles all have various in-depth examinations of their second hand depictions. Given that much of the Greek narratives come from second hand accounts, many interpretations, and debates, regarding the role of the "curse", the legacy of the various political reforms, as well as the origins of their family appear. While there isn't a strong debate regarding how influential this family was in the aftermath of their passing, during their prominence many scholars cite them as one of the founders of democratic and social reform.
