= Cylon of Athens =

7th-century BC Athenian noble and coup leader

Cylon (also Kylon; Ancient Greek: Κύλων) was an Athenian of the archaic period in Ancient Greece, primarily known for the events of the Cylonian Affair, an attempted seizure of power in the city. Cylon, one of the Athenian nobles and a previous victor of the Olympic Games in 640 BC, attempted a coup in either 636 BC or 632 BC with support from Megara, where his father-in-law, Theagenes, was tyrant.

== History in literature ==
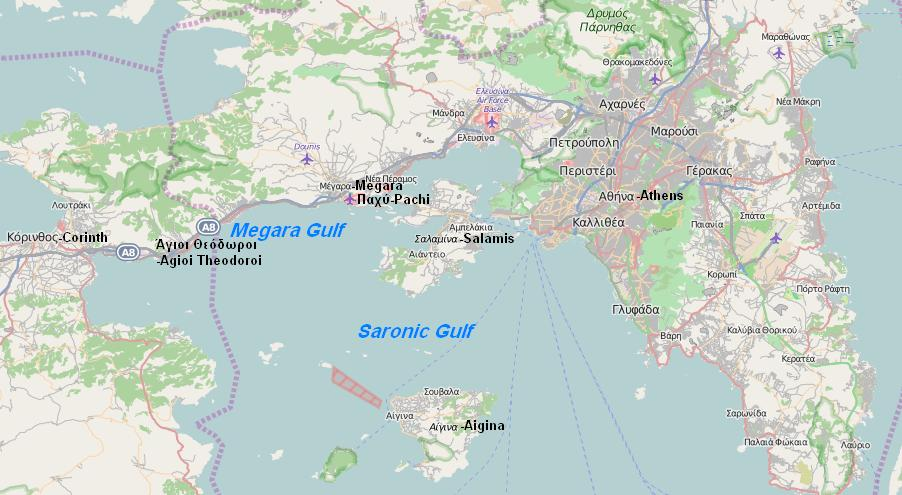
Modern map shows the location of Megara where Cylon's supporters hailed from, relative to the city of Athens

Scholarship has attempted to definitively date the events of Cylon's coup, but the only primary records of him come from Herodotus and Thucydides, both of whom only mention that he was a previous winner of the Olympic Games. According to Thucydides (1.126), the oracle at Delphi had advised Cylon to seize Athens during a festival of Zeus, which he understood to mean the Olympics, and become the tyrant of the city himself. Herodotus (5.71) mentions nothing about a festival of Zeus, and Thucydides (1.126) continues with the discussion of the festival called Diasia, leaving some scholars to question whether the attempted seize of Athens actually occurred during the Olympic Games. However, the coup was opposed by the masses, and Cylon and his supporters took refuge in Athena's temple on the Acropolis. According to Thucydides, while many of them suffered from famine and dehydration during their time of refuge, Cylon and his brother escaped, but his followers were cornered by Athens' nine archons. According to Plutarch and Thucydides, they were persuaded by the archons to leave the temple and stand trial after being assured that they were subject to any punishment except death. In an effort to ensure their safety, the accused tied a rope to the temple's statue of Athena and went to the trial. On the way, the rope (again, according to Plutarch) broke of its own accord. The Athenian archons, led by Megacles, took this as the goddess's repudiation of her suppliants and proceeded to stone them to death (on the other hand, Herodotus, (5.71), and Thucydides, (1.126), do not mention this aspect of the story, stating that Cylon's followers were simply killed after being convinced that they would not be harmed). Most likely, the story found in Plutarch is a later invention. In Herodotus' (5.71) version of the story, Cylon and his brother never escape and are subject to death along with their followers.

== Political implications ==
Athenian government in the archaic period of ancient Greece was almost entirely made up of elites who had long standing power and had little to no written laws to emphasize limitations of power or ideology. The nine archons were those of elite bloodline in the Archaic Period of Athens and held power for centuries prior to Cylon's attempted coup. However, in some contemporary cities throughout Greece, including Megara, governmental structure began to transfer to the rule of tyrants who took advantage of political instability and place themselves into power. In the context of antiquity, tyranny was associated with an unconstitutional takeover of power by an elite or person of high status that was not associated with the direct line of succession Cylon, with his elevated social status from winning the Olympics and knowledge of tyrannical governance from his father in law at Megara, conceived the idea to replicate a tyrannical overthrow in the familiar city of Athens. Even though Cylon's efforts failed, the state of governance in Athens in the following century after his attempted overthrow was filled with political change. Just two decades later in 621 BC, Draco devised the first version of written law in Athens which included provisions about homicide. Later in the 550s BC Athenian governance saw its first version of tyranny with the rise of Pisistratus to power who reigned until his death in 527 BC, and was then succeeded by his son Hippias who held power until 510 BC. The era of tyranny in Athens ended with Hippias' loss of power and two years later, Cleisthenes developed the state of Athenian democracy.

== Cylonian curse ==
Megacles and his genos, the Alcmaeonidae, were exiled from the city for violating the laws against killing suppliants. According to Herodotus (5.71), the Alcmaeonidae were cursed with a miasma ("stain" or "pollution") for committing deeds against the goddess Athena, which was inherited by later generations, even after the genos retook control of Athens. Thucydides cited that the nine archons and their descendants who were responsible for killing Cylon's supporters were cursed but does not name the Alcmaeonidae. Athens was purified from it by Epimenides of Phaistos. This Cretan seer was known as a close associate of Solon and a hermit who lived in a cave of Zeus. What would later be referred to as the Cylonian curse (Κυλώνειον ἄγος) was used by the Spartans as a political tool to expel the families who opposed their ally Isagoras. These families, led by Cleisthenes, were descended from the families accursed for slaying the followers of Cylon.

Historian Tim Rood has attempted to explain the differences between Thucydides' and Herodotus' versions of the stories a chapter called The Cylon Conspiracy: Thucydides and the Uses of the Past. He suggested that many modern scholars are not opposed to the idea that Thucydides was commenting on the event to correct Herodotus' version. Scholars who subscribe to this view have argued that Thucydides' writings were targeted in defense of the Alcmeonid family who were charged with the sacrilegious murders of Cylon's supporters. This notion is sometimes held because of Thucydides' failure to explicitly name the Alcmeonid family as harbingers of the Cylonian curse, instead only mentioning the nine archons and the "family" in charge of Athens at the time of the coup. Rood suggests that these differences expose the idea that the curse was used selectively in subsequent histories against the Alcmaeonids and their descendants specifically, rather than the archons as a whole, which is evident in Thucydides' details of Sparta using the curse as a political tool to keep Athens at bay.

== Archeological discoveries ==
In April 2016, two mass graves containing 80 bodies were found in Palaio Faliro, a suburb about four miles from Athens. 36 of the skeletons were bound in iron shackles and archeological evidence from artifacts around the graves dates them from the third quarter of the seventh century BC. It has been suggested by bioarcheologist Kristina Killgrove that they were the supporters of Cylon who were killed in the aftermath of his attempted coup, however the results are not definitive.
