= Isagoras =

Late 6th century BC Athenian aristocrat and opponent of Cleisthenes

Isagoras (Ancient Greek: Ἰσαγόρας), son of Tisander, was an Athenian aristocrat in the late 6th century BC.

He had remained in Athens during the tyranny of Hippias, but after Hippias was overthrown, he became involved in a struggle for power with Cleisthenes, a fellow aristocrat. In 508 BC he was elected archon eponymous, but Cleisthenes opposed him, with support from the majority of the population. Isagoras requested support from the Spartan king Cleomenes I, an old friend who had earlier been given hospitality by Isagoras. According to Herodotus, Cleomenes had had an affair with Isagoras's wife.

In 507 BCE, Isagoras, with Cleomenes's help, expelled Cleisthenes and other members of the Alcmaeonidae family on pretext of the Alcmaeonidaean stain (see Megacles). Cleisthenes's supporters and the ordinary Athenian citizens revolted against Isagoras's tyranny, and ended up trapping Isagoras and his Spartan allies on the Acropolis for two days. On the third day they made a truce, allowed Cleomenes and Isagoras to escape, and executed 300 of Isagoras's supporters. Cleisthenes then returned to the city and implemented reforms that created Athenian democracy.

== Notes ==
Preceded by Aristocracy under Cleisthenes	Ruler of Athens	Succeeded by Athenian democracy under Cleisthenes
