= Alcmaeon, son of Megacles =

6th-century BC Athenian general

Alcmaeon (Ancient Greek: Ἀλκμαίων) was son of Megacles, who was guilty of sacrilege with respect to the followers of Cylon, was invited by Croesus, king of Lydia, to Sardis in consequence of the services he had rendered to an embassy sent by Croesus to consult the Delphic oracle. On his arrival at Sardis, Croesus made him a present of so much gold that Alcmaeon could not carry it all out of the treasury. Alcmaeon took the king at his word by putting on a most capacious dress, the folds of which (as well as the vacant space of a pair of very wide boots, also provided for the occasion) he stuffed with gold, and then strewed in his hair gold-dust and stuffed more in his mouth. Croesus laughed at the trick, and presented him with as much again. This was supposed to have taken place around 590 BC. The wealth acquired thus is said to have contributed greatly to the subsequent prosperity of the Alcmaeonidae.

Alcmaeon was a breeder of horses for chariot races, and on one occasion gained the prize in a chariot-race at Olympia in 592. According to Plutarch, he commanded the Athenians in the First Sacred War, which began in 596.
