= Cleinias =

5th-century BC Athenian politician and father of Alcibiades

Cleinias (Ancient Greek: Κλεινίας, c. 480 – 447 BC), was a prominent Athenian. His father, Alcibiades, had been proxenos of Sparta, and was ostracised in 460 BC. He married Deinomache, the daughter of Megacles and a member of the important Alcmaeonid family, and had two sons, Alcibiades and Cleinias. Politically he was a supporter of Pericles, his wife's cousin. He died at the Battle of Coronea (447 BC), aged around 34. After his death his children were made wards of Pericles and his brother Ariphron.

Cleinias is also credited with the Cleinias Decree, which involved the tightening up of the process of tribute collection in the Athenian Empire. Attributing this inscription to this particular Cleinias, the father of Alcibiades, places the decree in the early 440s, usually given as 447, as Cleinias died at the Battle of Coronea in 447 BC. Although more recently, scholars have argued the Cleinias Decree was made in the 420s following Athens running low on money. Thus we cannot be certain this is the same Cleinias.
