= Agariste =

Agariste may refer to:

- Agariste of Sicyon (fl. c. 560 BC), daughter of Cleisthenes, the tyrant of Sicyon
- Agariste, mother of Pericles (c. 495–429 BC)
- Agariste (gastropod), a genus of snails in the family Fissurellidae
