= Eponymous archon =

Chief magistrate of an ancient Greek city-state

The eponymous archon (anc. Gk. ἐπώνυμος ἄρχων, romanized epōnymos archōn) was the chief magistrate in various ancient Greek city states, who gave his name to the year in which he held office, much like Roman consuls. "Archon" (ἄρχων, pl. ἄρχοντες, archontes) means "ruler" or "lord", frequently used as the title of a specific public office,

In Classical Athens, a system of nine concurrent archons evolved, led by three respective remits over the civic, military, and religious affairs of the state: the three office holders were known as the eponymous archon (ruler of Athens, the highest political office in the city-state), the polemarch (πολέμαρχος, "war ruler", the commander-in-chief of the Athenian military), and the archon basileus (ἄρχων βασιλεύς, "king ruler", the high priest of the city). The six others were the thesmothetai, judicial officers. Originally these offices were filled from the wealthier classes by elections every ten years. During this period the eponymous archon was the chief magistrate, the polemarch was the head of the armed forces, and the archon basileus was responsible for some civic religious arrangements, and for the supervision of some major trials in the law courts. After 683 BC the offices were held for only a single year, and the year was named after the eponymous archon.

== Background ==
The archon was the chief magistrate in many Greek cities, but in Athens there was a council of archons which exerted a form of executive government. From the late 8th century BC there were three archons: the archon eponymos, the polemarchos (originally with a military role, which was transferred to the ten strategoi in 501 BC), and the archon basileus (the ceremonial vestige of the Athenian monarchy). These positions were filled from the aristocracy (the Eupatridae) by elections every ten years. During this period Archon Eponymous was the chief magistrate, the Polemarch was the head of the armed forces, and the Archon Basileus was responsible for the civic religious arrangements.

After 683 BC the offices were held for only a single year, and the year was named after the archon eponymous. The year ran from July to June. The archon eponymous was the chief archon, and presided over meetings of the Boule and Ecclesia, the ancient Athenian assemblies. The archon eponymous remained the titular head of state even under the democracy, though with much reduced political importance. Under the reforms of Solon, himself archon eponymous in 594 BC, there was a brief period when the number of archons rose to ten. After 457 BC ex-archons were automatically enrolled as life members of the Areopagus, though that assembly was no longer extremely important politically.

One of the archons oversaw the procedure for ostracism after 487 BC. An archon's court was in charge of the epikleroi. Other duties of the archons included supervising the Panathenaea and Dionysia festivals.

== List of archons of Athens ==
In the following list of Archons, years where the name of the archon is unknown are identified as such. Years listed as "anarchy" mean that there was literally "no archon". There are various conflicting reconstructions of lists; sources for this list are given at the end. Note that the term of an archon covered two of our years, beginning in the spring or summer and continuing into the next spring or summer. The polemarch or strategoi, basileus, and thesmothetai (the six assistants to the archons) are also listed, where known.

=== Archaic period ===
==== Life archons ====
The later Athenian tradition varies on the exact position of this line; they held archonship for life, sometimes referred to as "Perpetual Archon", and exercised the sacral powers of kingship, as did the archon basileus later. The historicity of any of this ancient list may be reasonably doubted. However, Aristotle indicates, within the Constitution of Athens, that it was indeed the house of Codrus that abolished the title of king in favor of Archon.

Year	Archon	Other notable information
1068–1048 BC	Medon (Μέδων)	First ruler of Attica after the period of the Kings.
1048–1012 BC	Acastus (Ἄκαστος)	Troy VIIb_{2} destroyed (c. 1120 BC).
1012–993 BC	Archippus	
993–952 BC	Thersippus	
952–922 BC	Phorbas (Φόρβας)	Troy VIIb_{3}: deserted (c. 950 BC)
922–892 BC	Megacles (Μεγακλῆς)	
892–864 BC	Diognetus	
864–845 BC	Pherecles	Homer composes the Iliad and Odyssey. (c. 850 BC)
845–825 BC	Ariphron	
824–797 BC	Thespieus (Θεσπιεύς)	
796–778 BC	Agamestor	
778–755 BC	Aeschylus (Αἰσχύλος)	First Olympiad (776 BC)
755–753 BC	Alcmaeon (Ἀλκμαίων)	

==== Decennial archons ====
In 753 BC the perpetual archonship by the Eupatridae was limited to 10 years (the "decennial archons"):

Year	Archon	Other notable information
753–743 BC	Charops	In Rome, Romulus, the first ruler of the city, takes power.
743–733 BC	Aesimides	In Messenia, First Messenian War begins.
733–723 BC	Clidicus	Diaulos footrace introduced at the Olympics. (724 BC)
723–713 BC	Hippomenes	
713–703 BC	Leocrates	
703–693 BC	Apsander	Hesiod writes "Theogony" (c. 700 BC).
693–683 BC	Eryxias	Boxing added to the Olympics. (688 BC) Chalcedon colony founded (685 BC).

==== Annual archons ====
After 683 BC the archonship was limited to one year. Archons resided in the Prytaneion.

Year	Eponymous archon	Other officials or associated events
682–681 BC	Creon	Creon is considered by the ancient sources, and most modern authorities, as the first annual archon.
681–680 BC	Lysiades	Mentioned in the Parian Marble.
680–679 BC	Tlesias	Pausanias (IV.15.1) dates the beginning of the Second Messenian War to his archonship.
679–671 BC	Unknown	
671–670 BC	Leostratus	
670–669 BC	Unknown	
669–668 BC	Pisistratus	Pausanias (II.24.7) dates the first Battle of Hysiae to his archonship.
668–667 BC	Autosthenes	Pausanias (IV.23.4) dates the capture of Eira and the end of the Second Messenian War to his archonship.
667–664 BC	Unknown	
664–663 BC	Miltiades	
663–659 BC	Unknown	
659–658 BC	Miltiades	
658–645 BC	Unknown	Pausanias (VIII.39.3) dates the capture of Phigalia by the Spartans to his archonship.
645–644 BC	Dropides	The Parian Marble associates Dropides with the floruit of Terpander the Lesbian, who developed the music of the lyre.
644–639 BC	Unknown	
639–638 BC	Damasias	Thales was born
638–634 BC	Unknown	
634–633 BC	Epaenetus (?)	
633–632 BC	Unknown	
632–631 BC	Megacles	Cylon attempts to become tyrant
631–624 BC	Unknown	
624–623 BC	Aristaechmus	According to the Athenian Constitution, Dracon reformed the laws of Athens during the archonship of Aristaechmus.
623–621 BC	Unknown	

==== Reorganized ====
Year	Eponymous archon	Other officials or associated events
621–615 BC	Unknown	
615–614 BC	Heniochides	
614–605 BC	Unknown	
605–604 BC	Aristocles	The Parian Marble associates the archonship of Aristocles with Alyattes becoming king of Lydia. According to Debra Nails, Aristocles was the paternal grandfather of Plato.
604–600 BC	Unknown	
600–599 BC	Critias	The Parian Marble dates the flight of Sappho from Lesbos to Sicily in the archonship of Critias.
599–597 BC	Unknown	
597–596 BC	Cypselus	
596–595 BC	Telecles	
595–594 BC	Philombrotus	First Sacred War begins.
594–593 BC	Solon	Solon reforms Draco's code.
593–592 BC	Dropides	
592–591 BC	Eucrates	
591–590 BC	Simon	
590–589 BC	anarchy	
589–588 BC	Phormion	
588–587 BC	Philippus	
587–586 BC	Unknown	
586–585 BC	anarchy	
585–582 BC	Unknown	Pythian Games reorganised at Delphi.
582–581 BC	Damasias	According to the Athenian Constitution, Damasias held the archonship for two years and nine months before being expelled.
581–580 BC	Damasias	Demetrios of Phaleron states that it was during the archonship of Damasias that "Thales was first called wise".
580–579 BC	anarchy	Committee of 10 men serves jointly as archons
579–578 BC	anarchy	
578–577 BC	Unknown	
577–576 BC	Archestratidas	
576–570 BC	Unknown	
570–569 BC	Aristomenes	
569–566 BC	Unknown	
566–565 BC	Hippocleides	
565–561 BC	Unknown	
561–560 BC	Komeas	The Athenian Constitution dates the usurpation of Pisistratus as tyrant of Athens to the archonship of Komeas.
560–559 BC	Hegestratus	Phaenias of Eresus dates the death of Solon to the archonship of Hegestratus.
559–556 BC	Pisistratus	Tyrant, 3 unknown archons from 559 to 556 BC
556–555 BC	Hegesias	The Athenian Constitution dates the first expulsion of Peisistratos to the archonship of Hegesias.
555–554 BC	Euthidemus	
554–548 BC	Unknown	
548–547 BC	Erxicleides	Pausanias (X.5.13) dates the destruction by fire of the fourth temple of Delphi to his archonship.
547–546 BC	Thespius	Pisistratus becomes tyrant again
546–545 BC	Phormion	
545–536 BC	Unknown	
536-535 BC	[...]naios	The Parian Marble dates the first performance of Thespis to the tenure of this archon, whose name is damaged.
535–533 BC	Unknown	
533–532 BC	Thericles	
532–528 BC	Unknown	
528–527 BC	Philoneus	According to the Athenian Constitution, Philoneus was archon when Pisistratus died and his sons Hippias and Hipparchus succeeded him as tyrants
527–526 BC	Onetor	
526–525 BC	Hippias	
525–524 BC	Cleisthenes	Cleisthenes later made reforms, in 508 BC.
524–523 BC	Miltiades	Cadoux is uncertain whether this is Miltiades son of Kypselos, or Miltiades son of Cimon.
523–522 BC	Calliades	
522–521 BC	Pisistratus	Possibly the son of Hippias, archon of 526/5.
521–518 BC	Unknown	
518–517 BC	Hebron (?)	
517–511 BC	Unknown	
511–510 BC	Harpactides	The Parian Marble dates the assassination of Hipparchus and the expulsion of the Peistratids from Athens to Harpactides' archonship.
510–509 BC	Scamandrius	
509–508 BC	Lysagoras	
508–507 BC	Isagoras	Cleisthenes competes with Isagoras for archonship, but is expelled by Cleomenes I of Sparta
507–506 BC	Alcmeon	
506–504 BC	Unknown	
504–503 BC	Acestorides	
503–501 BC	Unknown	
501–500 BC	Hermocreon	
500–499 BC	Smyrus (?)	
499–497 BC	Unknown	
497–496 BC	Archias	
496–495 BC	Hipparchus	
495–494 BC	Philippus	
494–493 BC	Pythocritus	
493–492 BC	Themistocles	
492–491 BC	Diognetus	
491–490 BC	Hybrilides	
490–489 BC	Phaenippus	The Parian Marble, Plutarch, and the Athenian Constitution all date the Battle of Marathon to the archonship of Phaenippus.
489–488 BC	Aristides the Just	
488–487 BC	Anchises	
487–486 BC	Telesinus	The Athenian Constitution dates the ostracism of Megacles to the archonship of Telesinus.
486–485 BC	Unknown	
485–484 BC	Philocrates	
484–483 BC	Leostratus	
483–482 BC	Nicodemus	
482–481 BC	Unknown	
481–480 BC	Hypsichides	According to the Athenian Constitution, Hypsichides was archon when the ostracized of Athens were recalled.

=== Classical period ===
Year (BC)	Year Olympiads	Archon	Other officials or notable events
480–479	75.1	Calliades	Second Persian invasion of Greece. Aristides and Themistocles are strategoi.
479–478	75.2	Xanthippus	Battle of Plataea; Aristides is strategos
478–477	75.3	Timosthenes	Delian League founded.
477–476	75.4	Adimantus	
476–475	76.1	Phaedon	
475–474	76.2	Dromoclides	
474–473	76.3	Acestorides	
473–472	76.4	Menon	
472–471	77.1	Chares	
471–470	77.2	Praxiergus	
470–469	77.3	Demotion	
469–468	77.4	Apsephion	
468–467	78.1	Theagenides	
467–466	78.2	Lysistratus	
466–465	78.3	Lysanias	
465–464	78.4	Lysitheus	Sophanes is a strategos
464–463	79.1	Archedemides	Aeschylus' Danaids Trilogy produced.
463–462	79.2	Tlepolemus	Cimon is a strategos
462–461	79.3	Conon	According to the Athenian Constitution (ch. 25), Ephialtes reforms the Areopagus, and is assassinated.
461–460	79.4	Euthippus	Also spelled Euippos.
460–459	80.1	Phrasicles	
459–458	80.2	Philocles	Phrynicus, Dicaeogenes and Hippodamas are strategoi.
458–457	80.3	Habron	So Diodorus Siculus (11.79); other authorities state the eponymous archon for this year was Bion.
457–456	80.4	Mnesitheides	
456–455	81.1	Callias	
455–454	81.2	Sosistratus	
454–453	81.3	Ariston	
453–452	81.4	Lysicrates	
452–451	82.1	Chairephanes	Diodorus (11.88–91) skips over Chairephanes and dates the events of his archonship to the previous year
451–450	82.2	Antidotus	Anaxicrates and Cimon are strategoi
450–449	82.3	Euthydemus	
449–448	82.4	Pedieus	Second Sacred War begins.
448–447	83.1	Philiscus	Pericles, Tolmides and Epiteles are strategoi; Peace of Callias ends the Greco-Persian Wars
447–446	83.2	Timarchides	Construction of the Parthenon begins.
446–445	83.3	Callimachus	
445–444	83.4	Lysimachides	Peace between Athens and Sparta. Age of Pericles begins.
444–443	84.1	Praxiteles	Pericles is a strategos
443–442	84.2	Lysanias	Pericles is a strategos
442–441	84.3	Diphilus	Pericles is a strategos
441–440	84.4	Timocles	Pericles and Glaucon are strategoi
440–439	85.1	Morychides	Pericles is a strategos
439–438	85.2	Glaucinus	Also spelled Glaucidus. Pericles is a strategos
438–437	85.3	Theodorus	Pericles is a strategos
437–436	85.4	Euthymenes	Pericles is a strategos. Construction of the Propylaea begins
436–435	86.1	Lysimachus	So Diodorus Siculus (12.33); other authorities state the eponymous archon for this year was Nausimachos. Pericles is a strategos
435–434	86.2	Antiochides	Also spelled Antilochidos. Pericles is a strategos
434–433	86.3	Crates	Also spelled Chares. Pericles is a strategos
433–432	86.4	Apseudes	Pericles, Lacedaemonius, Diotimus, and Proteas are strategoi
432–431	87.1	Pythodorus	Beginning of the Peloponnesian War, according to Thucydides. Pericles and Callias are strategoi.
431–430	87.2	Euthydemus	Also spelled Euthydemos. Pericles is a strategos.
430–429	87.3	Apollodorus	Pericles dies; Xenophon, Hestiodorus, Calliades, Melesandrus, and Phanomachus are strategoi.
429–428	87.4	Epameinon	Phormio is a strategos.
428–427	88.1	Diotimus	Demosthenes, Asopius, Paches, Cleidippes, and Lysicles are strategoi
427–426	88.2	Eucles	Also spelled Eucleides. Nicias, Charoiades and Procles are strategoi
426–425	88.3	Euthynos	Also called Euthydemos. Laches and Hippocrates are strategoi
425–424	88.4	Stratocles	Nicias, Eurymedon, Pythodorus, and Sophocles are strategoi
424–423	89.1	Isarchus	Demosthenes, Cleon, Thucydides and Hippocrates are strategoi
423–422	89.2	Amynias	Also spelled Ameinias. Cleon is a strategos
422–421	89.3	Alcaeus	Cleon is a strategos
421–420	89.4	Aristion	Construction of the Erechtheion begins.
420–419	90.1	Astyphilus	Alcibiades is strategos
419–418	90.2	Archias	
418–417	90.3	Antiphon	Laches and Nicostratus are strategoi
417–416	90.4	Euphemus	
416–415	91.1	Arimnestus	Nicias, Alcibiades, and Lamachus are strategoi
415–414	91.2	Charias	Also spelled Chabrias. Alcibiades is a strategos
414–413	91.3	Tisandrus	Lamachus is a strategos
413–412	91.4	Cleocritus	Eurymedon, Demosthenes, and Nicias are strategoi
412–411	92.1	Callias Scambonides	
411–410	92.2	Mnasilochus (died); Theopompus	Simichus and Aristarchus are strategoi
410–409	92.3	Glaucippus	
409–408	92.4	Diocles	Anytus is a strategos
408–407	93.1	Euctemon	
407–406	93.2	Antigenes	Alcibiades, Adeimantus, and Aristocrates are strategoi
406–405	93.3	Callias Angelides	Archestratus, Thrasylus, Pericles, Lysias, Diomedon, Aristocrates, Erasinides, Protomachus, and Aristogenes are strategoi
405–404	93.4	Alexias	Battle of Aegospotami. Adeimantus, Eucrates, Philocles, Menandrus, Tydeus, and Cephisodotus are strategoi
404–403	94.1	Pythodorus	Sparta sets up the oligarchy of the Thirty Tyrants; Pythodorus not recognized as Eponymous Archon
403–402	94.2	Eucleides	Thirty Tyrants expelled, democracy reestablished. Old Attic alphabet was officially abolished in favor of the Ionic alphabet of twenty-four letters.
402–401	94.3	Micon	Also spelled Micion.
401–400	94.4	Xenaenetus	Also spelled Exaenetus.
400–399	95.1	Laches	
399–398	95.2	Aristocrates	
398–397	95.3	Euthycles	Also spelled Ithycles.
397–396	95.4	Souniades	
396–395	96.1	Phormion	
395–394	96.2	Diophantus	
394–393	96.3	Eubulides	
393–392	96.4	Demostratos	Adeimantus is a strategos
392–391	97.1	Philocles	
391–390	97.2	Nicoteles	
390–389	97.3	Demostratus	Thrasybulus and Ergocles are strategoi
389–388	97.4	Antipater	Agyrrhius and Pamphilus are strategoi
388–387	98.1	Pyrgion	Thrasybulus and Dionysius are strategoi
387–386	98.2	Theodotus	Peace of Antalcidas ends the Corinthian War
386–385	98.3	Mystichides	
385–384	98.4	Dexitheus	
384–383	99.1	Dieitrephes	Also spelled Diotrephes
383–382	99.2	Phanostratus	
382–381	99.3	Euandrus	
381–380	99.4	Demophilus	
380–379	100.1	Pytheas	
379–378	100.2	Nicon	
378–377	100.3	Nausinicus	
377–376	100.4	Calleas	Also spelled Callias.
376–375	101.1	Charisander	Cedon is a strategos.
375–374	101.2	Hippodamas	
374–373	101.3	Socratides	
373–372	101.4	Asteius	Iphicrates, Callistratus, Chabrias, and Timotheus are strategoi
372–371	102.1	Alcisthenes	
371–370	102.2	Phrasicleides	
370–369	102.3	Dysnicetus	(mistakenly Dyscinetus in Pausanias 4.27.9)
369–368	102.4	Lysistratus	
368–367	103.1	Nausigenes	
367–366	103.2	Polyzelus	
366–365	103.3	Ciphisodorus	Chabrias is a strategos
365–364	103.4	Chion	Iphicrates is a strategos
364–363	104.1	Timocrates	
363–362	104.2	Charicleides	Ergophilus and Callisthenes are strategoi
362–361	104.3	Molon	Leosthenes and Autocles are strategoi.
361–360	104.4	Nicophemus	Timomachus is a strategos
360–359	105.1	Callimides	Menon, Timotheus, and Cephisodotus are strategoi
359–358	105.2	Eucharistus	
358–357	105.3	Cephisodotus	
357–356	105.4	Agathocles	Chabrias is a strategos.
356–355	106.1	Elpines	Iphicrates, Timotheus, and Menestheus are strategoi.
355–354	106.2	Callistratus	
354–353	106.3	Diotemus	
353–352	106.4	Thudemus	
352–351	107.1	Aristodemus	
351–350	107.2	Theellus	Theogenes is Basileus (possibly)
350–349	107.3	Apollodorus	
349–348	107.4	Callimachus	Hegesileus is a strategos
348–347	108.1	Theophilus	
347–346	108.2	Themistocles	Proxenus is a strategos
346–345	108.3	Archias	
345–344	108.4	Eubulus	
344–343	109.1	Lyciscus	Phocion is a strategos.
343–342	109.2	Pythodotus	
342–341	109.3	Sosigenes	
341–340	109.4	Nicomachus	
340–339	110.1	Theophrastus	Phocion is a strategos
339–338	110.2	Lysimachides	Phocion is a strategos, and is defeated by Philip II of Macedon
338–337	110.3	Chaerondas	Lysicles is a strategos
337–336	110.4	Phrynichus	
336–335	111.1	Pythodelos	Also spelled Pythodoros, served as Archon the same year as Philip II of Macedon (Alexander the greats father) was assassinated.
335–334	111.2	Euaenetus	
334–333	111.3	Ctesicles	
333–332	111.4	Nicocrates	
332–331	112.1	Nicetes	Also spelled Niceratos
331–330	112.2	Aristophanes	
330–329	112.3	Aristophon	
329–328	112.4	Cephisophon	
328–327	113.1	Euthicritus	
327–326	113.2	Hegemon	
326–325	113.3	Chremes	
325–324	113.4	Anticles	Philocles is a strategos
324–323	114.1	Hegesias	Also spelled Agesias
323–322	114.2	Cephisodorus	Also spelled Cephisophon. Phocion and Leosthenes are strategoi. Battle of Amorgos signals the end of Athenian sea power.
322–321	114.3	Philocles	End of the Lamian War. Restriction of voting rights and installation of a Macedonian garrison in the Piraeus.

=== Hellenistic period ===
Year	Eponymous archon	Other officials or notable events
321–320 BC	Archippus	
320–319 BC	Neaechmus	
319–318 BC	Apollodorus	
318–317 BC	Archippus	
317–316 BC	Demogenes	Demetrius of Phalerum installed by the Macedonian regent Cassander as Governor.
316–315 BC	Democleides	
315–314 BC	Praxibulus	
314–313 BC	Nikodorus	
313–312 BC	Theophrastus	So Diodorus Siculus (19.73); other authorities state the eponymous archon for this year was Theodorus.
312–311 BC	Polemon	Seleucid Empire begins.
311–310 BC	Simonides	
310–309 BC	Hieromnemon	
309–308 BC	Demetrius	
308–307 BC	Caerimus	Also spelled Charinus.
307–306 BC	Anaxicrates	Demetrius Phalereus is expelled when Demetrius I Poliorcetes captures the city from Cassander.
306–305 BC	Coroebus	Antigonid dynasty begins.
305–304 BC	Euxenippus	
304–303 BC	Pherecles	
303–302 BC	Leostratus	
302–301 BC	Nicocles	
301–300 BC	Clearchus	
300–299 BC	Hegemachus	
299–298 BC	Euctemon	
298–297 BC	Mnesidemus	
297–296 BC	Antiphates	
296–295 BC	Nicias	
295–294 BC	Nicostratus	
294–293 BC	Olympiodorus	
293–292 BC	Olympiodorus	Serving for a second time
292–291 BC	Philippus	
291–290 BC	Charinus (?)	
290–289 BC	Ambrosius (?)	
289–288 BC	Ariston (?)	
288–287 BC	Cimon	
287–286 BC	Xenophon	
286–285 BC	Diocles	
285–284 BC	Diotimus	
284–283 BC	Isaeus	
283–282 BC	Euthius	
282–281 BC	Nicias	Attalid dynasty begins.
281–280 BC	Ourias	
280–279 BC	Telecles	
279–278 BC	Anaxicrates	the Gallic invasion of Greece under Brennus and Acichorius occurs
278–277 BC	Democles	
277–276 BC	Aristonymus	
276–275 BC	Philocrates	
275–274 BC	Olbius	
274–273 BC	Eubulus	
273–272 BC	Glaucippus	
272–271 BC	Lysitheides	
271–270 BC	Pytharatus	
270–269 BC	Sosistratus	
269–268 BC	Peithidemus	Beginning of the Chremonidean War; Athens declares war on Macedon, ruled by Antigonus Gonatas.
268–267 BC	Diogeiton	
267–266 BC	Menecles	
266–265 BC	Nicias (Otryneus)	
265–264 BC	Eubulus	
264–263 BC	Diognetus	Diognetus is the latest archon mentioned in the Parian Chronicle, therefore that inscription was made during his tenure.
263–262 BC	Antipatrus	Athens surrenders to Antigonus Gonatas in the archonship of Antipatros.
262–261 BC	Arrheneides	Antigonus Gonatas imposes a new regime on Athens.
261–260 BC	[...]sinus	
260–259 BC	Philostratus	
259–258 BC	Philinus	
258–257 BC	Antiphon	
257–256 BC	Thymochares	
256–255 BC	Antimachus	
255–254 BC	Cleomachus	
254–253 BC	Phanostratus	
253–252 BC	Pheidostratus	
252–251 BC	Callimedes	
251–250 BC	Thersilochus	
250–249 BC	Polyeuctus	
249–248 BC	Hieron	
248–247 BC	Diomedon	
247–246 BC	Theophemus	
246–245 BC	Philoneos	
245–244 BC	Cydenor	
244–243 BC	Lysiades	
243–242 BC	Eurycleides	
242–241 BC	Phanomachus	
241–240 BC	Lyceus	
240–239 BC	Polystratus	
239–238 BC	Athenodorus	
238–237 BC	Lysias	
237–236 BC	Alkibiades	
236–235 BC	Cimon	
235–234 BC	Ecphantus	
234–233 BC	Lysanias	
233–232 BC	Unknown	
232–231 BC	Mneseides (?)	
231–230 BC	Jason (?)	
230–228 BC	Unknown	
228–227 BC	Heliodorus	
227–226 BC	Leochares	
226–225 BC	Theophilus	
225–224 BC	Ergochares	
224–223 BC	Nicetes	
223–222 BC	Antiphilus	
222–221 BC	Euxenus	
221–220 BC	Unknown	
220–219 BC	Thrasyphon	
219–218 BC	Menecrates	
218–217 BC	Chaerephon	
217–216 BC	Callimachus	
216–215 BC	Unknown	
215–214 BC	Hagnias	
214–213 BC	Diocles	First Macedonian War begins. (214 BC)
213–212 BC	Euphiletus	
212–211 BC	Heracleitus	
211–210 BC	Archelaus	
210–209 BC	Aeschron	
209–208 BC	Unknown	
208–207 BC	Unknown	
207–206 BC	Callistratus	
206–205 BC	Pantiades	
205–204 BC	Diodotus	
204–203 BC	Apollodorus	
203–202 BC	Proxenides	
202–201 BC	Dionysius	
201–200 BC	Isocrates	
200–199 BC	Nicophon	
199–198 BC	[...]ppus	
198–197 BC	Unknown	
197–196 BC	Ancylus	
196–195 BC	Pleistaenus	
195–194 BC	Unknown	
194-193 BC	Dionysius	
193–192 BC	Phanarchides	
192–191 BC	Diodotus	
191–190 BC	Timouchus	
190–189 BC	Demetrius	
189–188 BC	Euthycritus	
188–187 BC	Symmachus	
187–186 BC	Theoxenus	
186–185 BC	Zopyrus	
185–184 BC	Eupolemus	
184–183 BC	Charicles	
183–182 BC	Hermogenes	
182–181 BC	Timesianax	
181–180 BC	Hippias	
180–179 BC	Dionysius	
179–178 BC	Menedemus	
178–177 BC	Philon	
177–176 BC	[...]ppus	
176–175 BC	Hippacus	
175–174 BC	Sonicus	
174–173 BC	Alexander	
173–172 BC	Alexis	
172–171 BC	Sosigenes	
171–170 BC	Antigenes	
170–169 BC	Aphrodisius	
169–168 BC	Eunicus	
168–167 BC	Xenocles	
167–166 BC	Nicosthenes	
166–165 BC	Achaeus (?)	
165–164 BC	Pelops	
164–163 BC	Euergetes	
163–162 BC	Erastus	
162–161 BC	Poseidonius	
161–160 BC	Aristolas	
160–159 BC	Tychandrus	
159–158 BC	Aristaemus	
158–157 BC	Aristaechmus	
157–156 BC	Anthesterius	
156–155 BC	Callistratus	
155–154 BC	Mnestheus	
154–153 BC	Unknown	
153–152 BC	Phaidrias	
152–151 BC	Andreas (?)	
151–150 BC	Zeleucus (?)	
150–149 BC	Speusippos (?)	Fourth Macedonian War begins (150 BC).
149–148 BC	Lysiades (?)	
148–147 BC	Archon	
147–146 BC	Epicrates	Rome takes control of Greece

=== Roman period ===
Year	Eponymous archon	Other officials or notable events
146–145 BC	Aristophantus (?)	
145–144 BC	Metrophanes (?)	
144–143 BC	Theaetetus	
143–142 BC	Aristophon	
142–141 BC	Micion (?)	
141–140 BC	[Dionysius]	
140–139 BC	Hagnotheus	
139–138 BC	Diocles	
138–137 BC	Timarchus	
137–136 BC	Heracleitus	
136–135 BC	Timarchides	
135–134 BC	Dionysius	
134–133 BC	Nicomachus	
133–132 BC	Xenon	
132–131 BC	Ergocles	
131–130 BC	Epicles	
130–129 BC	Demostratus	
129–128 BC	Lyciscus	
128–127 BC	Dionysius	
127–126 BC	Theodorides	
126–125 BC	Diotimus	
125–124 BC	Jason	
124–123 BC	Nicias (died); Isigenes	
123–122 BC	Demetrius	
122–121 BC	Nicodemus	
121–120 BC	Phocion (?)	
120–119 BC	Eumachus	
119–118 BC	Hipparchus	
118–117 BC	Lenaeus	
117–116 BC	Menoetes	
116–115 BC	Sarapion	
115–114 BC	Nausias	
114–113 BC	[...]raton	
113–112 BC	Paramonus	
112–111 BC	Dionysius	
111–110 BC	Sosicrates	
110–109 BC	Polycleitus	
109–108 BC	Jason	
108–107 BC	Demochares	
107–106 BC	Aristarchus	
106–105 BC	Agathocles	
105–104 BC	Andronides (?)	
104–103 BC	Heracleides	
103–102 BC	Theocles	
102–101 BC	Echecrates	
101–100 BC	Medeius	Served as archon again in 91–90, 90–89, 89-88 BC.
100–99 BC	Theodosius	
99–98 BC	Procles	
98–97 BC	Argeius	
97–96 BC	Heracleitus	
96–95 BC	[...]craton	
95–94 BC	Theodotus	
94–93 BC	Callias	
93–92 BC	Criton	
92–91 BC	Menedemus	
91–90 BC	Medeius	Previously served as archon in 101-100 BC, continued in office for the next two years, probably indicating a constitutional crisis.
90–89 BC	Medeius	
89–88 BC	Medeius	
88–87 BC	anarchy	Athens captured by Lucius Cornelius Sulla, who reorganizes its government
87–86 BC	Philanthes	
86–85 BC	"Hierophant"	His personal name is obscured due to hieronymy
85–84 BC	Pythocritus	
84–83 BC	Nicetas	
83–82 BC	Pammenes	
82–81 BC	Demetrius	
81–80 BC	Ar[...]	
80–79 BC	Apollodorus	
79-78 BC	Unknown	
78–77 BC	Aeschraeus	
77-76 BC	Seleucus	
76–75 BC	Heracleodoros	
75–74 BC	Aeschines	
74–73 BC	Unknown	
73–72 BC	Nicetes (?)	
72–71 BC	Unknown	
71–70 BC	Aristoxenus (?)	
70–69 BC	Criton (?)	
69–67 BC	Unknown	
67–66 BC	Theoxenus (?)	
66–65 BC	Medeius (?)	Probably the son of Medeius, archon in 101–100, 91–90, 90–89, and 89-88 BC
65–64 BC	Unknown	
64-63 BC	Oenophilus	
63-62 BC	[...]ius	
62–61 BC	Aristeius	
61–60 BC	Theophemus	
60–59 BC	Herodes	
59–58 BC	Leucius	
58–57 BC	Calliphon	
57–56 BC	Diocles	
56–55 BC	Coentus	
55–54 BC	Aristoxenus	
54–53 BC	Zenon	
53–52 BC	Diodorus	
52–51 BC	Lysander	
51–50 BC	Lysiades	
50–49 BC	Demetrius	
49–48 BC	Demochares	
48–47 BC	Philocrates	
47–46 BC	Diocles	
46–45 BC	Eucles	
45–44 BC	Diocles	
44–43 BC	Leucius / Lucius of Rhamnous	
43-42 BC	Polycharmus	
42–41 BC	Euthydomus	
41–40 BC	Nicander	
40–39 BC	Philostratus	
39–38 BC	Diocles of Melite	
38–37 BC	Menander of Steiria	
37–36 BC	Callicratides (?)	
36–35 BC	Asclepiodorus	
35–34 BC	Theopeithes	
34–33 BC	Apollogenes (?)	
33–32 BC	Cleidamus	
32-31 BC	Unknown	
31–30 BC	Unknown	
30–29 BC	Architemus	
29–26 BC	Unknown	The Roman Republic transitions into the Roman Empire upon Octavian being granted the title "Augustus" by the Roman Senate.
26–25 BC	Dioteimus	
25–22 BC	Unknown	
22–21 BC	Apolexis	
20–19 BC	Demeas	
19–17 BC	Unknown	
17-16 BC	Ae[...]	
16–15 BC	Pythagoras	
15–14 BC	Antiochus	
14–13 BC	Polyaenus	
13–12 BC	Zenon	
12–11 BC	Leonidas	
11–10 BC	Theophilus	
10–9 BC	Nicias	
9–8 BC	Xenon	
8–7 BC	Apolexis son of Philocrates	
7–6 BC	Unknown	
6–5 BC	Nicostratus	
5–4 BC	Cotys	King of Thrace, father of Rhoemetalces, archon of 36–37.
4–3 BC	Anaxagoras	
3–2 BC	Demochares	
2–1 BC	Polycharmus	
1 BC–AD 1	Lacon	
1–2	Democrates	
2–3	[...] of Sounium	
3–4	[...] of Sphettus	
4–5	[...]on	
5–23	Unknown	
23–24	M[...]	The archons from M... to Antipater are traditionally assigned to AD 23–31, but may be up to seven years earlier than this.
24–25	Charm[...]	
25–26	Callicr[...]	
26–27	Pamphilus	
27–28	Themistocles	
28–29	Oenophilus	
29–30	Boethus	
30–31	[(Vipsanius) Antipa]ter	Son of Antipater of Phlya; father of the archon of 45–46, grandfather of the archon of ca. 75, and ancestor of the archon of ca. 110–115.
31-36	Unknown	
36–37	King Rhoemetalces Ne(oterus)	King of Odrysian Thrace Son of Cotys, archon of 5-4 BC.
37–38	Arist[...] (?)	
38-39	Polycritus (?)	
39-40	Zen[on] (?)	
40-41	[...]ouius Leo[...]	
41-45	Unknown	
ca. 42	Ti. Claudius Lysiades the younger	Presumably son of another archon named Lysiades, ancestor of Ti. Claudius Lysiades, Demostratus, and Philippus, archons of 174–175, 180–181, and 193–194.
45–46	(Vipsanius) Antipater neoterus	Son of the archon of 30–31, father of the archon of ca. 75, and ancestor of the archon of ca. 110–115.
46–49	Unknown	
49–50	Deinophilus	
50–54	Unknown	
53–54	Dionysodorus	
54–56	Unknown	
56–57	Konon	Grandfather of Flavius Sophocles, archon of 103–104.
57–61	Unknown	
61–62	Thrasyllus	
62–65	Unknown	
64–65	C. Carrinus Secundus, son of Gaius	
65–66	Demostratus	
66-74	Unknown	
ca. 75	(Vipsanius) Aeolion	Grandson of the archon of 30/1, son of the archon of 45/6, and grandfather of the archon of ca. 110–115.
75–81	Unknown	
82-83	Anarchy	Synchronised by Phlegon of Tralles with the consulship of Domitian and Petilus Rufus
83-84	Annius [Thrasylus]?	
ca. 84-90	Q. Vibius Crispus	
ca. 85	Ti. Claudius Demostratus of Sounium	Exact date uncertain
87-88	Domitian	As Roman Emperor
ca. 80-90	L. Flavius Flammas of Cydathenaeum	Exact date uncertain
ca. 85-90	T. Flavius Leosthenes of Paeania	Exact date uncertain
91-92	Q. Trebellius Rufus	Also a Roman Senator and high priest of the imperial cult for Narbonese Gaul.
92-93	anarchy	
ca. 93	C. Julius Antiochus; Epiphanes Philopappus (?)	Grandson of the last king of Commagene
ca. 94	[Annius Pythod]orus	
95–96	Octavius Theon	
96–97	Octavius Proclus	
97-99	unknown	
99–100	T. Coponius Maximus of Hagnus	
100–101	Lucius Vibullius Hipparchus of Marathon	
101–102	Flavius Stratolaus	
102-103	Claudius Demophilus	
103-104	Flavius Sophocles of Sounium	Grandson of Conon, archon of 56-57 or 57–58.
104-105	T. Flavius Alcibiades of Paeania	Son of T. Flavius Leosthenes, archon ca. 85-90 AD
105-106	unknown	
106-107	Cassius Diogenes	
107-108	Flavius Euphanes	
108-109	G. Julius Cassius of Steiria	Ancestor of Cassianus Apollonius, archon ca. 203–208, Cassianus "Sacred Herald", archon of 231–232, and Cassianus Philippus, archon of 237–238.
109–110	Flavius Pantaenus of Gargettus	Builder of the Library of Pantainos
ca. 110-115	Vipsanius Aeolion of Phlya	Grandson of (Vipsanius) Aeolion, archon ca. 75 AD.
ca. 110-120	Diocles of Phalerum	
111–112	Hadrian	Subsequently, Roman emperor
ca. 112-115	Didius Secundus of Sphettus	
ca. 115	Galerius Em-	
116–117	Flavius Macrinus of Acharnae	
ca. 120	Fulvius Metrodorus of Sounium	
ca. 120	Zopyrus son of Dionysius of Agryle	
ca. 120-130	D. Junius Patron of Berenicidae	
ca. 125	Ti. Claudius Chrysippus of Phlya	
126–127	Herodes Atticus	Adoptive son and nephew of Vibullius Hipparchus, archon in 118/9, also builder the Panathenaic Stadium and the Odeon, and a notable sophist.
127–128	Memmius Peisander of Collytus	
ca. 128–131	Claudius Dometianus	
131–132	Claudius Philogenes of Besa	
ca. 130-140	Q. Alleius Epictetus	
ca. 130-140	Popillius Ligys	
ca. 130-140	L. ... of Anaphlystus	Name not preserved and date very approximate.
138–139	Praxagoras Timotheus of Thoricus	
139–140	T. Flavius Alcibiades	Son of T. Flavius Alcibiades, archon in 104/5
140–141	Ti. Claudius Attalus Andragathus of Sphettus	Originally of Synnada in Phrygia, also patron of the association of Dionysiac artists, priest of the Harmony of the Greeks and Zeus Eleutherius at Plataia
141–142	P. Aelius Phileas of Melite	
142–143	P. Aelius Alexander of Phalerum	
143–144	P. Aelius Vibullius Rufus of Marathon	Son of Vibullius Hipparchus, archon in 118/9 and nephew of Herodes Atticus, archon in 126/7
144–145	Sulla	Assignment to this year is not certain.
145–146	Arrian	Originally of Nicomedia, also Roman consul ca. 130, governor of Cappadocia, and historian.
146–147	T. Flavius [...]	The record of his name is garbled; it might have been "Tiberius Flavius Alcibiades."
ca. 147–152	L. Nummius "Sacred Herald" of Phalerum	His personal name is obscured due to hieronymy
150–151	Aelius Ardys	
152–153 or 153-154	L. Nummius Menis of Phalerum	
152–153 or 153-154	Pompeius "Torchbearer"	His personal name is obscured due to hieronymy
154–155	(Aelius) Praxagoras of Melite	
155–156	Popillius Theotimus of Sounium	
ca. 156–160	Aelius Callicrates	
ca. 156-160	Aelius Gelos of Phalerum	
156-157 or 157-158	Lycomedes of Leuconoeum	
157-158 or 159-160	Dionysius of Leuconoeum	
158–159	Ti. Aurelius Philemon of Philaedae	
159-160	Unknown	
160-161	P. Aelius Themison, also called Pammenes of Azenia	
161–162	L. Memmius "Altar priest" of Thoricus	His personal name is obscured due to hieronymy
162-163	Flavius Harpalianus of Steiria	
163–164	Philistides of Piraeus	Father of Aristocleides, archon of 176-177 and Philistides, archon of ca. 194–200, grandfather of Aurelius Philistides, archon of ca. 225 AD.
164–165	'Arrius Epaphroditus	
165–166	Sextus of Phalerum	
166–167	Marcus Valerius Mamertinus of Marathon	Subject of a trial before Marcus Aurelius.
167–168	anarchy	Rotoff suggests that the absence of an archon for this year, and two of the following four years, was likely due to the Antonine Plague.
168–169	Tineius Ponticus of Besa	
169–170	anarchy	
170–171	Tiberius Memmius Flaccus of Marathon	
171–172	anarchy	
172–173	Lucius Gellius Xenagoras of Melite	Originally of Delphi. Father of Xenagoras, archon of ca. 213–220.
173–174	Veisius Piso of Melite	
ca. 174–175	Ti. Claudius Lysiades of Melite	Descendant of Lysiades the younger, archon ca. 42 AD, brother of Ti. Claudius Demostratus, archon of 180–181, and uncle of Ti. Claudius Philippus, archon of 193/4.
175–176	Claudius Heracleides of Melite	
176-177	Aristocleides of Piraeus	Son of Philistides, archon of 163–164, brother of Philistides, archon of ca. 194–200, uncle of Aurelius Philistides, archon of ca. 225 AD.
177-178 or 178-179	Sallustianus Aeolion of Phyla	
179-180	[Scrib]onius Capito	
180–181	Claudius Demostratus	Descendant of Lysiades the younger, archon ca. 42 AD, brother of Ti. Claudius Lysaides, archon of ca. 174–175, and father of Ti. Claudius Philippus, archon of 193/4.
181-182	Athenodorus of Eitea	
182–183	Marcus Munatius Maximianus Vopiscus of Azenia	Father of Munatius Themison, archon ca. 205.
183–184	Domitius Aristaeus of Paeonidae	Perhaps an uncle of Domitius Arabianus, archon ca. 216-226 and thus originally from Amastris.
184–185	Titus Flavius Sosigenes of Pallene	
185–186	Philotimus son of Arcesidemus of Elaeous	
186–187	C. Fabius Thisbianus of Marathon	Probably father of Fabius "torchbearer", archon ca. 210–211. Perhaps of Peloponesian origin.
187–188	Ti. Claudius Bradua Atticus	Son of Herodes Atticus, archon of 126–127
188–189	Commodus	Also Roman Emperor
189–190	Menogenes	
190–191	Julius "Hierophant"	His personal name is obscured due to hieronymy
191–192	Gaius Pinarius Proculus of Hagnus	
192–193	Unknown	
ca. 192-200	Aelius Alexander of Phalerum	Brother of Aelius Gelos, archon ca. 192–200.
ca. 192-200	Aelius Gelos of Phalerum	Brother of Aelius Alexander, archon ca. 192–200.
ca. 192-200	Quintus ... of Eleusis	
ca. 192-200	Pompeius Alexander of Acharnae	
193–194	Ti. Claudius "Torchbearer"	His personal name is obscured due to hieronymy, but is known from earlier sources to have been Philippus. Descendant of Lysiades the younger, archon ca. 42 AD, nephew of Ti. Claudius Lysaides, archon of ca. 174–175, and son of Ti. Claudius Demostratus, archon of 180–181.
ca. 194-201	Philisteides of Piraeus	Son of Philistides, archon of 163–164, brother of Aristocleides, archon of ca. 176–177, uncle of Aurelius Philistides, archon of ca. 225 AD.
195-196	Gaius Helvidius Secundus of Pallene	
ca. 195-205	Flavius "Iacchagogue" of Agryle	His personal name is obscured due to hieronymy
196-197	Unknown	
ca. 196-206	Claudius Phocas of Marathon	
197-198	Annius ... of Sphettus	Uncertain
ca. 199-200	Flavius Straton	
197-198	Xenokles (?)	
198–199	Titus Flavius Sosigenes Palleneus (?)	
199-200	Dionysodorus Eucarpon (?)	
ca. 200	Pomp. Hegias of Phalerum	
ca. 200	Aurelius Dem[...] (?)	
Early 3rd cent.	P. Aelius Apollonius of Pallene	
ca. 200-220	Claudius Apolloniarius	
200-201	Unknown	
201-202	C. Quintus Himertus of Marathon	Father of Cleon, archon ca. 215–226.
202-203	Anarchy	
203-209	Unknown	
ca. 203-208	Gaius Cassianus Apollonius of Steiria	Descendant of Julius Cassius, archon of 108–109, cousin of Cassianus "Sacred Herald", archon of 231–232, and father of Cassianus Philippus, archon of 237–238.
ca. 205	M. Munatius Themison of Azenia	Son of Munatius Maximianus Vopiscus, archon of 182–183.
209–210	Flavius Diogenes of Marathon	
ca. 210-211	Fabius "Torchbearer" of Marathon	His personal name is obscured due to hieronymy, from earlier sources it is known to have been Thisbianus. Probably son of Fabius Thisbianus, archon of 186–187.
ca. 210-220	Aelius He[racleides?] of Steiria	
210-215	Unknown	
ca. 212-	... Agathocles	Following the Constitutio Antoniniana in this year, Roman citizenship and was extended to all Athenians who had not already received it, with the nomen Aurelius.
ca. 213-220	L. Gellius Xenagoras of Melite	Son of Xenagoras, archon of 172–173.
ca. 213-220	Ti. Claudius L- of Melite	
ca. 213-230	Aurelius Calliphron presbyterus	
215–216	Aurelius Dionysius of Acharnae	
216-220	Unknown	
ca. 216–226	Domitius Arabianus of Marathon	Probably Marcus Ulpius Domitius Aristaeus Arabianus, legate of Asia ca. 208–217, originally of Amastris. Perhaps a nephew of Domitius Aristaeus, archon ca. 183–184.
ca. 216-226	G. Quintus Cleon of Marathon	Son of Himertus, archon of 201–202.
ca. 216-226	Ti. Claudius Patroclus of Lamptrae	
220–221	Philinus	
ca. 220	P. Pomp. Hegias of Phalerum	
ca. 220-230	G. Pinarius Bassus	
221-222	Unknown	
222-223	Aurelius Melpomenus	
223-227	Unknown	
ca. 225	Aurelius Philistides	Grandson of Philistides, archon of 163–164, nephew of Philistides, archon ca. 194–201, and son of Aristocleides, archon of ca. 176–177.
227-228	A- ...	
228-231	Unknown	
ca.230	Marcus Ulpius Eubiotus Leurus of Hypata	Suffect consul sometime before his archonship, related by marriage to Emperor Pupienus.
231-232	Cassianus "Sacred Herald" of Steiria	His personal name is obscured due to hieronymy, from earlier sources we know that it was Bassus. Descendant of Julius Cassius, archon of 108–109, cousin of Cassianus Apollonius, archon ca. 203-208 and Cassianus Philippus, archon of 237–238.
232-235	Unknown	
234–235	... Epictetus of Acharnae	
236-237	Unknown	
240–241	Cas[sianus Philippus] of Steiria	Descendant of Julius Cassius, archon of 108–109, son of Cassianus Apollonius, archon ca. 203–208, cousin of Cassianus "Sacred Herald", archon of 231–232.
238-240	Unknown	
239-240 or 240-241	Flavius Asclepiades of Diomeia	
240-255	Unknown	
ca. 240-253	Aurelius Laudicianus	
ca. 240-260	Claudius Teres	Originally from Illyria.
ca. 250	Marcus Aurelius Calliphron, also called Frontinus of Gargettus	Father of Cornelianus, archon ca. 260.
255-256	Lucius Flavius Philostratus of Steiria	Perhaps grandson of the author Philostratus
ca. 255	Aurelius Dionysius of Lamptrae	
ca.255	P. Herennius Dexippus	Also archon Basileus? Later led Athenian troops against the Heruls.
255-264	Unknown	
ca. 260	M. Herennius Calliphron, also called Cornelianus of Gargettus	Son of Calliphron / Frontinus, archon ca. 250.
264–265	Publius Licinius Egnatius Gallienus	Also Roman Emperor
ca. 267-268	Titus Flavius Mondon of Phlya	Archon twice and also priest of Athena Polias and the Harmony of the Greeks; he was originally from Thespiae.
between 300 and 330	Constantine the Great	
between 300 and 350	Hegeias	
end 4th century	Phaedrus	
386-387	Hermogenes	
c. 475	Theagenes	
484-485	Nicagoras	

== See also ==
- Category:Eponymous archons
- Timeline of ancient Greece
- Regnal name
- Archon basileus
- Hierotheos the Thesmothete, reported first head of the Christians of Athens.
- Polemarch (replaced in 501 BC by ten strategoi)
- Roman consul
