= Affair of Epidamnus =

Coup by Epidamnus' democratic faction (c. 436 – 433 BCE)

Date	c. 436 – 433 BCE
Location	The western coast of Greece from modern day Albania to Corfu
Result	Initial Oligarch victory: Epidamnus's Democratic regime is replaced and Oligarchs are reinstalled;

Belligerents
Epidamnian Oligarchs; Taulantii; Corcyra (joined 435 BCE) Athens, with the material support of the Delian League (joined 433 BCE)	Epidamnian Democrats; Corinth (joined 435 BCE); Supported with ships by most of the Peloponnesian League, namely: Megara; Pale (only in 435 BCE); Epidaurus (only in 435 BCE); Hermione (only in 435 BCE); Troezen (only in 435 BCE); Leucas; Ambracia; Thebes (only monetarily); Phlius (only monetarily); Elis Anactorium (only in 433 BCE)

The Affair of Epidamnus, also known as the Epidamnian Affair, is cited by the Ancient Greek historian Thucydides as one of the major immediate causes for the Peloponnesian War. The conflict began as a minor coup by a democratic faction of the city-state of Epidamnus (later Roman Dyrrachium, now modern-day Durrës), but eventually escalated into a major conflict between the cities of Athens and Corcyra (modern Corfu) on one side and the city of Corinth on the other. The culminating Battle of Sybota subsequently led to the Potidaean Affair and the Megarian Decree, both also major contributors to the final outbreak of hostilities between Athens and Sparta, beginning the Peloponnesian War.

== Background ==
Epidamnos was a city-state located on the modern-day Albanian coast facing the Adriatic Sea north of the Strait of Otranto. The city was founded by colonists from the nearby city of Corcyra. Like many other Greek city states, Epidamnos suffered from internecine factionalism between Oligarchs and Democrats. According to Thucydides, her proximity to nearby barbarian tribes led to wars, one of which eventually weakened the ruling Oligarchic coalition, leading to a coup that installed a Democratic regime. The Oligarchs defected to the attacking Illyrian tribes, who in turn proceeded to sack and plunder the Epidamnian countryside while notably, their mother colony Corcyra refused to intervene. This led the Epidamnian Democrats and Oligarchs alike to turn to other city states for help.

== Escalation ==
Besieged and desperate, in 435 BCE, the Epidamnian Democrats turned to Corcyra's mother colony of Corinth for assistance. Despite originally being a colony of Corinth, Corcyra was not perceived favorably by their mother city. Quoting Thucydides, "[The Corinthians] hated the Corcyraeans for their contempt of the mother country. Instead of meeting with the usual honours accorded to the parent city by every other colony at public assemblies, such as precedence at sacrifices, Corinth found herself treated with contempt by a power which in point of wealth could stand comparison with any even of the richest communities in Hellas." Seeing an opportunity to undermine the prestige of one of their own rebellious colonies, Corinth promised aid, troops, and even colonists to the Epidamnian Democrats. At this point, the Corcyraeans were unwilling to sit idly by while one of their major rivals meddled in their own colony's affairs, and they too joined in the fray. They demanded that the Epidamnian Democrats relinquish power to the Oligarchs and expel the Corinthians.

Corinth was a member of the larger Spartan-led Peloponnesian League, one of the only two major post-Greco-Persian Wars alliance networks, the other being Athens's Delian League. Although Sparta was reluctant to intervene in the conflict, the Corinthians managed to secure the material support of other League members such as Megara and Thebes. Intimidated, the Corcyraean leadership attempted to come to terms with Corinth via Spartan, Peloponnesian, or Delphic mediation, but were stymied by Corinthian stubbornness on the matter. When Corcyra threatened to seek Athenian aid, the Spartans applied pressure on their Corinthian allies to come to terms. Still, the Corinthians could only offer the harsh terms of total Corcyraean withdrawal to even consider a deal. When the Corcyraeans, still seeking a peaceful settlement, suggested a mutual truce, the Corinthians declared war and prepared an invasion of Epidamnus. This invasion fleet was intercepted by a superior Corcyraean force and defeated at the Battle of Leucimme, which led subsequently to the surrender of the Democrats.

Undeterred and vengeful, the Corinthians spent two years building up their naval forces in preparation for another decisive showdown. Archaeological evidence attests to a major spree of coinage as the Corinthians mustered their monetary resources. The speed with which Corinth turned an utter humiliation into an opportunity to build the third-largest fleet in Greece has led the historian Ronald Legon to call it one of the "most significant military developments of the fifth century" in his analysis of antebellum naval power balance. As Legon also notes in the same paper, Corinth was geographically cut off from timber sources as a result of the defeat, making their recovery even more impressive. He concludes that given the geographical situation at the time, the Corinthians could only have built their new fleet with the tacit support of Athenian merchant power, which called Corcyraean claims of being able to call Athenians to arms into question, something Donald Kagan also notes in his analysis. Intimidated, the Corcyraeans finally made good on their promise and sought aid from the Athenians, while the Corinthians sent emissaries to stop them.

== The Athenians join ==
The Athenians were conflicted about whether or not to make an alliance with the incoming Corcyraean emissaries. Kagan summarizes the factors facing the Athenians in his The Peloponnesian War. On the one hand, an alliance with Corcyra practically guaranteed Athenian naval dominance, as it would unite the two largest fleets in the Greek world. Thucydides quotes the Corcyraean emissaries as saying, "Remember that there are but three considerable naval powers in Hellas—Athens, Corcyra, and Corinth—and that if you allow two of these three to become one, and Corinth to secure us for herself, you will have to hold the sea against the united fleets of Corcyra and Peloponnese. But if you receive us, you will have our ships to reinforce you in the struggle." In addition, the Corinthians were clearly the aggressors in the conflict, and although such an alliance seemed to violate the spirit of the Thirty Years' Peace between Sparta and Athens after the First Peloponnesian War, it was not explicitly disallowed, since Corcyra belonged to neither power bloc. On the other hand, the Athenians felt no special affinity or ties with the Corcyraeans and were afraid of embroiling themselves in a larger conflict with Corinth or even the Peloponnesian League.

The Athenian response was unprecedented in the history of Greek diplomacy. Led by the famous statesman Pericles, the Athenians, instead of a full symmachia, or defensive-offensive alliance, would only establish a defensive epimachia, agreeing to assist Corcyra only when it was aggressively attacked by Corinth first. The decision was a compromise between those who saw war with the Peloponnesian League as inevitable and those who sought to deter war by all means. According to Plutarch's Parallel Lives, Pericles "advised the people to send help to the Corcyræans, who were attacked by the Corinthians, and to secure to themselves an island possessed of great naval resources, since the Peloponnesians were already all but in actual hostilities against them." The spirit of compromise was demonstrated when Athens decided to send only a measly fleet of just ten triremes to the aid of the Corcyraeans, meant to deter rather than provoke the Corinthians by demonstrating Athens's willingness to stand by their newfound ally. In addition, this fleet was under strict orders not to join any battle unless the Corinthians intended to invade Corcyraean territories or allies.

== The Battle of Sybota ==
The Athenians hoped first and foremost to deter the Corinthians from action and to defuse the crisis with their presence. If this failed, they at least hoped to stay out of any subsequent engagement and allow the formidable Corcyraean fleet, whose power had already been well demonstrated at Leucimme, to defeat the Corinthians again. The Corinthians launched an invasion of Corcyra herself, meeting the enemy forces near the Sybota islands at the mouth of the Corfu channel. This time, the Corinthians, bolstered by Peloponnesian allies, were numerically superior to their foes and managed to rout the Corcyraean forces in the initial engagement, which prompted the Athenians to join the fray as the allies prepared to defend Corcyra herself. However, the Corinthians misinterpreted a small fleet of 20 Athenian reinforcements as a massive fleet and retreated, losing the initiative. This battle, a stalemate unsatisfactory for either side, is remembered to history as the Battle of Sybota.

== Aftermath and consequences ==
Hostilities between the Athenian and Corinthian alliances did not end at Sybota. The feeling of insecurity in the aftermath of the partial defeat led Athens to pre-emptively dismantle the walls around its tributary of Potidaea, beginning the so-called Potidaean Affair. The resultant rebellion and battle saw direct violations of the Thirty Years' Peace from both sides. Combined with the heightened tensions caused by the punitive Megarian Decree, which the previous paper by Legon claims was partly sparked by Corinthian naval build up prior to Sybota, the Spartans eventually joined the war themselves, officially beginning the Peloponnesian War.

== Historicity of the conflict ==
Like with much of the Peloponnesian War, historians of this period rely on Thucydides's monumental work, History of the Peloponnesian War, whose second chapter is devoted solely to the conflicts concerning Epidamnus and Potidaea. While Thucydides is detailed in his analysis, he is not a perfect narrator. One analysis of the Epidamnian affair in particular by Mabel Lang pointed out numerous moments in the narrative where Thucydides includes seemingly unrelated information or does not elaborate on seemingly key reasons behind major events, sometimes, it seems, to craft a narrative post facto on Corinthian aggression and connection to the larger Athenian-Spartan conflict. There is also irrefutable evidence that events like the Battle of Leucimme occurred in some capacity. For example, an archaeological study of coinage by the numismatist Jonathan Kagan corroborated and added detail to Thucydides's account of Athenian and Corcyraean support for Epidamnus.

Dates are also a difficulty in studying the period as the Julian calendar was not in use in Thucydides's time. Harry Mortimer Hubbell's 1929 study of events between Leucimme and Sparta's declaration of war presents the chronology used in this article. While there are difficulties in determining the order and relationship between the Battle of Potidaea and the Megarian Decree, the chronology of the Epidamnus Affair is more well-established.

== Legacy ==
The Roman playwright Plautus chose Epidamnus as the setting for his play Menaechmi, which was later adapted into William Shakespeare's The Comedy of Errors. Although Shakespeare changed the setting to Ephesus, he left references to the original location throughout the play, and one scholar has gone so far as to argue the choice to leave mentions of an island where misunderstandings and bluffs led to a destructive war was no mistake on the part of Shakespeare.
