= Cleinias, brother of Alcibiades =

Cleinias (Ancient Greek: Κλεινίας) was the son of Cleinias, and a younger brother of the famous Athenian statesman Alcibiades, and a member of the wealthy and influential Alcmaeonidae family. Pericles, who was the guardian of the youths, and who feared Alcibiades might somehow corrupt Cleinias, sent the latter away from his own house and placed him for education with his (that is, Pericles') brother Ariphron; but the latter sent him back at the end of six months, finding it impossible to make anything of him. In one of the dialogues of Plato, he is spoken of as quite a madman.
