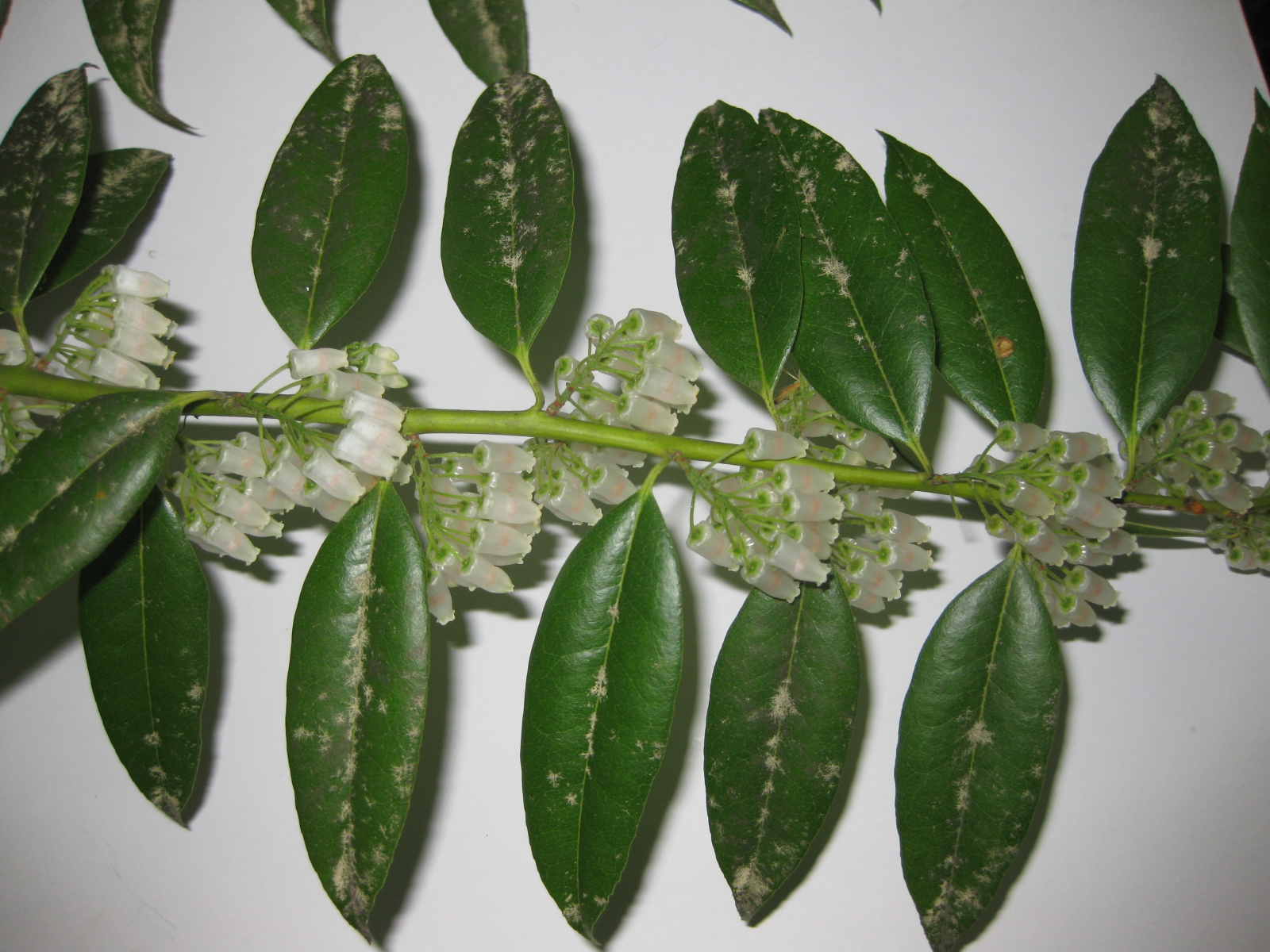

Conservation status
- Apparently Secure (NatureServe)

Scientific classification
- Kingdom: Plantae
- Clade: Tracheophytes
- Clade: Angiosperms
- Clade: Eudicots
- Clade: Asterids
- Order: Ericales
- Family: Ericaceae
- Genus: Agarista
- Species: A. populifolia

Binomial name
- Agarista populifolia Lam.

Synonyms
- Andromeda populifolia Lam.; Leucothoe populifolia (Lam.) Dippel; Lyonia populifolia (Lam.) K. Koch

= Agarista populifolia =

Species of flowering plant

Agarista populifolia is a plant species in the family Ericaceae with the common name of Florida hobblebush. It forms dense thickets which are difficult to penetrate, thus the common name. Stems often arching. It is found in the southeastern United States inhabiting moist to wet woodlands. It is an evergreen shrub with small white flowers on the underside of its arching branches.
