= Cleisthenes of Sicyon =

6th-century BC tyrant of Sicyon

Cleisthenes (/ˈklaɪsθɪniːz/ KLYSSE-thin-eez; Ancient Greek: Κλεισθένης) was the tyrant of Sicyon from c. 600–560 BC, who aided in the First Sacred War against Kirrha that destroyed that city in 595 BC. He was also said to have organized a successful war against Argos because of his anti-Dorian feelings. After his victory he abolished all the rhapsodes of Homer, because they praised the citizens of Argos. The key innovation of his reign, which Herodotus mentions, was the reformation of the tribal system in the city of Sicyon. Herodotus states that he gave new names to the four tribes of Sicyon, calling his own tribe "Rulers of the People" and naming the other three tribes after swine, donkeys, and pigs. However, Herodotus does not describe the nature of Cleisthenes' reform. Whatever it was, all the tribes kept their new names for sixty years after Cleisthenes' death.

Cleisthenes of Sicyon organized a competition whose prize would be marriage to his beautiful daughter Agariste. The two main competitors were the Alcmaeonid Megacles and Hippocleides. Because Hippocleides made a fool of himself by dancing drunkenly in front of Cleisthenes, Megacles was chosen to marry Agariste.

Descendants of Cleisthenes include his grandson Cleisthenes of Athens and his great-great-grandson Pericles of Athens.

His death is estimated around 570 or 545 BC.

== Sources ==
- Sealey, Raphael, A History of the Greek City States 700–338 B.C. Berkeley: University of California Press, 1976.
