= Cleocritus =

Archon of Athens during 413–412 BC

Cleocritus (Ancient Greek: Κλεόκριτος) was an Athenian leader of religious ceremonies, the kerux or herald, famous for the beauty of his voice. He was one of the Athenians driven from the city during the civil war of the Thirty Tyrants in 403 BCE. When the exiles gathered themselves into an army and returned to the city, Cleocritus was chosen as their spokesman and delivered a famous speech, which Xenophon records (Hellenica 2.4.20-21):

"Citizens, why are you keeping us out of Athens? “Why do you want to kill us? We never did anything bad to you. Not at all. We have joined with you in the holiest rituals, in the most beautiful sacrifices and festivals. We have been fellow dancers with you, fellow students, and fellow soldiers. We have undergone many dangers with you on land and sea for the sake of our common freedom and safety. For gods’ sake – for the sake of the gods of our fathers and mothers – for the sake of our kinship, our marriage ties, and our fellowship – because many of us share in all these – show reverence for gods and men. Put a stop to this crime against our city, and cease to obey those thirty, those horrible irreverent men who, in eight months, have killed almost more Athenians than the Peloponnesians did in ten years of war."
