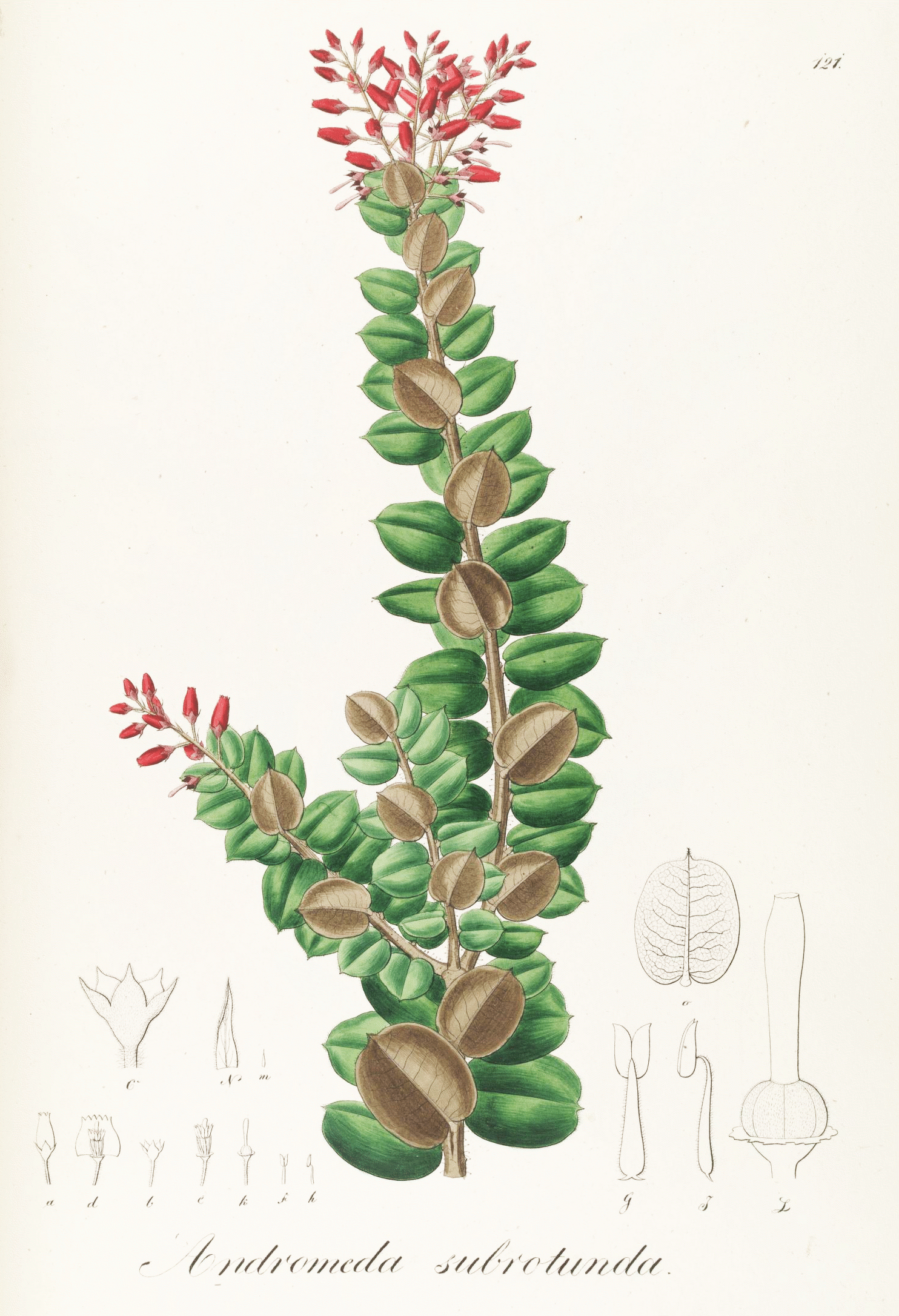
- Agarista subrotunda

Scientific classification
- Kingdom: Plantae
- Clade: Tracheophytes
- Clade: Angiosperms
- Clade: Eudicots
- Clade: Asterids
- Order: Ericales
- Family: Ericaceae
- Subfamily: Vaccinioideae
- Tribe: Lyonieae
- Genus: Agarista; D.Don ex G.Don

Synonyms
- Agauria (DC.) Hook.f.; Amechania DC.

= Agarista (plant) =

Genus of flowering plants

Agarista is a genus of plants in the family Ericaceae. Agarista species contain grayanotoxins, a group of closely related neurotoxins named after Leucothoe grayana, native to Japan.

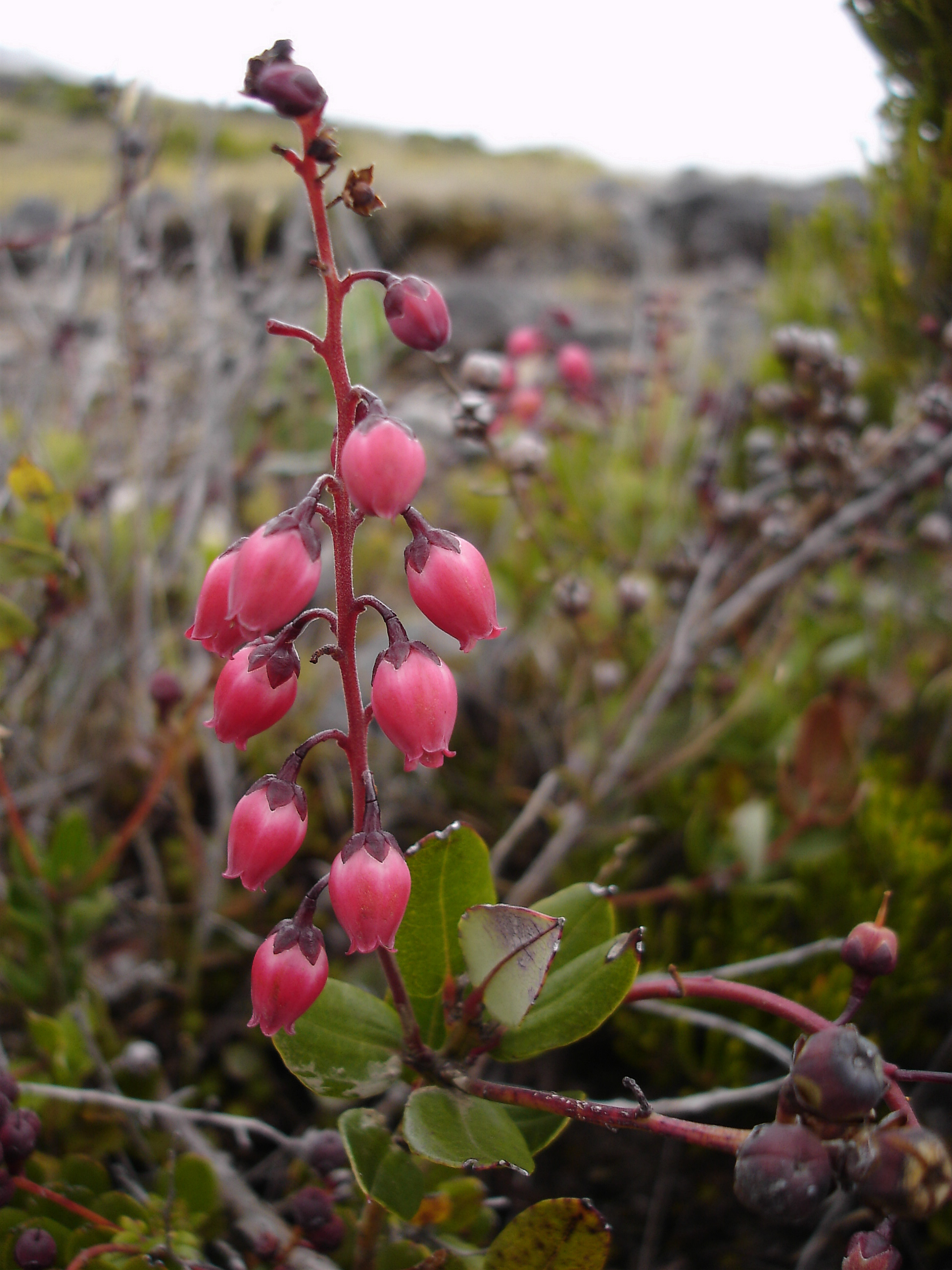
Agarista buxifolia

== Species ==
As of March 2026, Plants of the World Online accepts 33 species:

- Agarista albiflora (B.Fedtsch. & Basil.) Judd
- Agarista angustissima Taub.
- Agarista boliviensis (Sleumer) Judd
- Agarista bracamorensis (Kunth) G.Don
- Agarista buxifolia (Lam.) G.Don
- Agarista chapadensis (Kin.-Gouv.) Judd
- Agarista chlorantha (Cham.) G.Don
- Agarista coriifolia (Thunb. & Billb.) Hook.f. ex Nied.
- Agarista duartei (Sleumer) Judd
- Agarista duckei (Huber) Judd
- Agarista ericoides Taub.
- Agarista eucalyptoides (Cham. & Schltdl.) G.Don
- Agarista glaberrima (Sleumer) Judd
- Agarista hispidula (DC.) Hook.f. ex Nied.
- Agarista mexicana (Hemsl.) Judd
- Agarista minensis (Glaz. ex Sleumer) Judd
- Agarista niederleinii (Sleumer) Judd
- Agarista nummularia (Cham. & Schltdl.) G.Don
- Agarista oleifolia G.Don
- Agarista organensis (Gardner) Hook.f. ex Nied.
- Agarista paraguayensis (Sleumer) Judd
- Agarista populifolia (Lam.) Judd
- Agarista pulchella G.Don
- Agarista pulchra G.Don
- Agarista revoluta (Spreng.) Hook.f. ex Nied.
- Agarista revolutissima A.A.Samp. & R.P.Oliveira
- Agarista salicifolia (Lam.) G.Don
- Agarista sleumeri Judd
- Agarista subcordata (Dunal) Judd
- Agarista subrotunda G.Don
- Agarista uleana (Sleumer) Judd
- Agarista villarrealana L.M.González
- Agarista virgata Judd

== Taxonomy ==
The genus name of Agarista is in honour of Agariste of Sicyon (fl. 6th century BC, around 560 BC). It was first described and published in A General History of the Dichlamydeous Plants, Volume 3 in 1834.
