= Miasma (ancient Greek religion) =

Contagious power believed to have a life of its own

In ancient Greek religion, a miasma was "a contagious power... that has an independent life of its own. Until purged by the sacrificial death of the wrongdoer, society would be chronically infected by catastrophe."

An example is that of Atreus, who invited his brother Thyestes to dine on a delicious stew, which had been prepared with the butchered flesh of Thyestes’s own sons. As a result, a miasma contaminated the entire family of Atreus, where one violent crime led to another, providing fodder for many of the Greek heroic tales. Attempts to cleanse a city or a society from miasma may have the opposite effect of reinforcing it.

Religion in ancient Greece is connected with politics, and some ideas regarding pollution (agos), curses, sins of ancestors, are an important part of both the civic and the religious order. Agos may occur as a result of wrongdoings or sacrilege, as it brings about both religious and social consequences, which can be emphasized through public practices and legal acts. Thus, moral and religious wrongdoings in ancient Greece were directly related to the sphere of civic authority.

== Curses ==
Agos may occur as an automatic divine punishment or curse pronounced by socially prominent people for any wrongdoing. However, such curses may not only include a person but also his/her offspring. Furthermore, their effects involve such occurrences as infertility, natural disasters, or abnormal birth.

Despite the fact that agos may occur both automatically and be pronounced publicly, there is no clear divide between these types of punishments, because both of them are connected to each other. Curses were generally pronounced by people who held positions of significant social importance, such as priests, magistrates, parents, and even rulers. Public curses pronounced by the magistrates were especially aimed against any action posing a threat to the state. For example, they might punish for treason, poisoning, or betrayal.

== Mythology and inherited pollution ==
The fate of some families, such as Labdacids and Tantalids, was associated with an ongoing cycle of inherited crime and divine punishment of it as well as with inner family conflicts. Often, such punishment is imposed by the mythical agents of divine punishment, the Erinyes.

Children were also punished for crimes committed by ancestors, like lying or committing sacrilege. However, as far as tragic literature goes, this concept is always shown in terms of both inherited conditions and more personal moral choice instead of simple divine punishment.

== Social and religious effect ==
Such a notion had its practical application within the structure of ancient society and religion. Thus, individuals or families suffering from contamination of pollution could be ostracized from any ceremonies, religious events, public gatherings, and even normal social interaction, such as the inability to be included in sacrifices and prayers. In severe cases, polluted people could be exiled or put to death due to their potentially disruptive influence on civic life.

Guilt inheritance may also affect the legal status of descendants in a way. For example, they could lose some civic rights, become socially or politically outcast citizens, also known as atimos. Though it was not a strict legal practice, one still had to pay attention to one's reputation and family history during one's personal and matrimonial life. On the other hand, one’s fame and loyalty to the state played an equally important role here.

== Greek interpretation ==
In general, these beliefs and concepts can be seen as part of the system connecting morality, religion, and politics of ancient Greece together. Additionally, while they were not limited to pure supernatural belief systems, these concepts served the purpose of preserving order and social norms. At the same time, Greek tragedy shows how flexible such practices and ideas were in reality (Parker, 192, 201, 206).

== See also ==
- Miasma theory
- Panacea (medicine)
