= Raphael Sealey =

British-American classical scholar, ancient historian (1927–2013)

Bertram Raphael Izod Sealey (14 August 1927, Middlesbrough, England – 29 November 2013, Berkeley, California) was a classical scholar and ancient historian.

== Education ==
Sealey graduated from Oxford University in 1947, then served in the British Army for two years. He studied at University College, Oxford in England under George Cawkwell, receiving an M.A. from Oxford University in 1951. He continued his studies in Tübingen and Hamburg.

== Academic career ==
Raphael Sealey was Professor of History at the University of California at Berkeley from 1967 to 2000, specialising in Ancient Greek history and law. Before coming to Berkeley, he had taught at the University College of North Wales, at Queen Mary College, University of London, and at the State University of New York at Buffalo.

== Selected books ==
Sealey's books include:

- A History of the Greek City States, 700-338 B.C. (Oakland: University of California Press, 1976).
- The Athenian Republic (State College: Pennsylvania State University Press, 1987).
- Women and Law in Classical Greece (Chapel Hill: University of North Carolina Press, 1990).
- Demosthenes and His Time (Oxford: Oxford University Press, 1993).
- The Justice of the Greeks (Ann Arbor: University of Michigan Press, 1994).
