= Agariste of Sicyon =

Mother of the Athenian politician Cleisthenes

Agariste (/æɡəˈrɪstiː/; Ancient Greek: Ἀγαρίστη; fl. c. 560 BC) was the daughter, and possibly the heiress, of the tyrant of Sicyon, Cleisthenes. Her father wanted to marry her to the "best of the Hellenes" and organized a competition whose prize was her hand in marriage. According to his declaration, all the eligible young men had to appear in Sicyon within 60 days. Twelve competitors appeared and Cleisthenes held a banquet in his guests' honour.

Cleisthenes preferred the former archon Hippocleides but, during the dinner, the suitor embarrassed himself. According to Herodotus, Hippocleides became intoxicated and began to act like a fool; at one point, he stood on his head and kicked his legs in the air, keeping time with the flute music. When Hippocleides was informed that he had "danced away his bride," his response was οὐ φροντίς Ἱπποκλείδῃ, ("Hippocleides doesn't care" or "It doesn't matter to Hippocleides"). Herodotus' description insinuates a bawdy pun: the phrase "danced the bride away" may also be read as "displayed your testicles", in reference to Hippoclides standing on his head while wearing a tunic, which would have exposed his genitals to the guests.

After a year-long party for the suitors, Megacles of the Alcmaeonid clan was chosen to marry Agariste. She gave birth to two sons, Hippocrates and Cleisthenes, the reformer of the Athenian democracy, and a daughter, Coesyra, who married Peisistratus. Hippocrates was the father of another Megacles (ostracized 486 BC), who was the maternal grandfather of Alcibiades, and a daughter, Agariste, the mother of Pericles and Ariphron.

W. K. Lacey felt that Agariste was an epikleros, or sole heiress who was required to have children to perpetuate her father's family.

In 1834, botanists published Agarista a genus of plants in the family Ericaceae, named in honour of Agariste of Sicyon.

== See also ==
- L'Olimpiade, an opera based on the competition for Agariste's hand.
