= Megacles =

Name of several men of ancient Athens

Megacles or Megakles (Ancient Greek: Μεγακλῆς) was the name of several notable men of ancient Athens, as well as an officer of Pyrrhus of Epirus.

== The first eponymous archon ==
The first Megacles that appears was legendary archon of Athens from 922 BC to 892 BC.

== Second Archon eponymous ==
The second Megacles was a member of the Alcmaeonidae family, and the archon eponymous in 632 BC when Cylon made his unsuccessful attempt to take over Athens. Megacles was convicted of killing Cylon's supporters (who had taken refuge on the Acropolis as suppliants of Athena) and was exiled from the city, along with all the other members of his genos, the Alcmaeonidae. The Alcmaeonidae inherited a miasma ("stain") that lasted for generations among Megacles' descendants.

== Alcmaeonidae ==
The third Megacles, the grandson of the above eponymous archon, son of Alcmaeon and member of the Alcmaeonidae family, was an opponent of Pisistratus in the 6th century BC. He drove out Pisistratus during the latter's first reign as tyrant in 560 BC, but the two then made an alliance with each other, and Pisistratus married Megacles' daughter. Herodotus says that they also tricked the Athenians into believing Athena herself had arrived to proclaim Pisistratus tyrant, by dressing up a woman named Phye as the goddess, although Herodotus himself casts doubt on the truth of this story. However, Megacles turned against Pisistratus when Pisistratus refused to have children with Megacles' daughter, which brought an end to the second tyranny.

This Megacles earlier had competed with Hippocleides, a future archon of Athens, to marry Agarista, the daughter of Cleisthenes of Sicyon. They had two sons. The elder was Hippocrates, whose children were another Megacles (ostracized 486 BC) and a daughter Agariste, the mother of Pericles and Ariphron (himself the father of Hippocrates of Athens who died 424 BC). The younger son was Cleisthenes, who was allegedly the grandfather of Deinomache (or Dinomache), mother of Alcibiades (d. 404 BC). Thus, Megacles the elder was great-grandfather of Pericles and the great-great-grandfather of Alcibiades.

== Battle of Marathon ==
The fourth Megacles, grandson of the above, son of Hippocrates, and nephew of Cleisthenes is sometimes described as the father of Deinomache and thus the maternal grandfather of Alcibiades. Other sources, notably William Smith, insist that his uncle Cleisthenes was the grandfather of Alcibiades.

In 490 BC, in the aftermath of the Battle of Marathon, a shield-signal was raised on Mount Pentelicon above Marathon supposedly to signal the Persians to sail around Cape Sounion and attack the unguarded city of Athens. Herodotus reports that the Alcmaeonidae were widely believed to have been behind this act of treachery. With Megacles being the leading figure of the Alcmaeonid clan at the time, a lingering suspicion of medism hung over him.

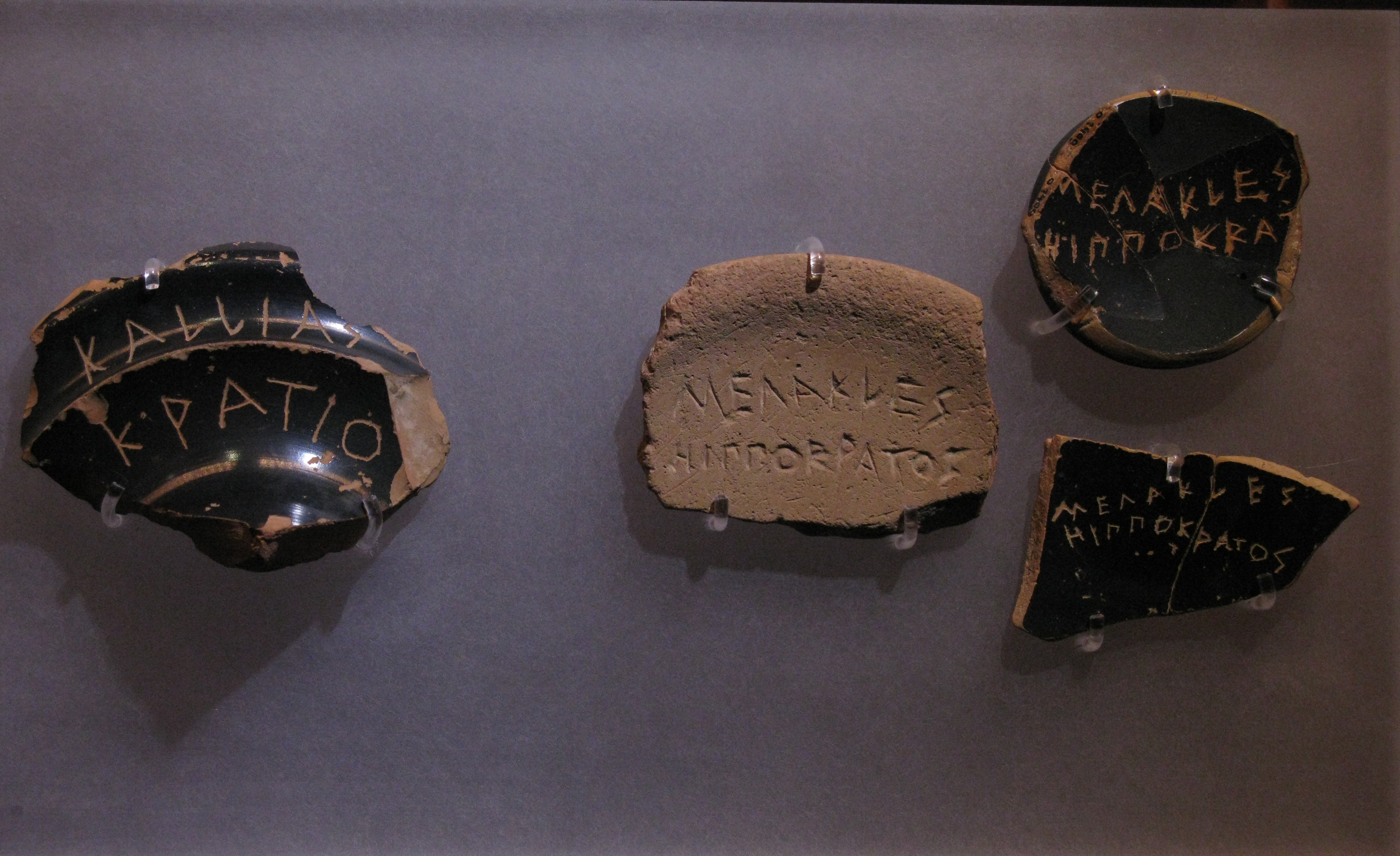
Ostraka against Megacles

In 486 BC, Megacles was ostracised. Numerous ostraca have been found with comments on them making reference to his ostentatious wealth and love of luxury.

He was honored by Pindar as exiled winner in the chariot race of Pythian Games 486 BC.

== Megacles of Epirus ==
Megacles of Epirus was an officer in the service of Pyrrhus of Epirus, who accompanied that monarch on his expedition to Italy, 280 BC. He is mentioned as accompanying Pyrrhus when he reconnoitered the Roman camp previous to the battle of Heraclea; and in that action was the means of saving the king's life, by exchanging armour with him, and thus directing the efforts of the assailants upon himself, instead of Pyrrhus. He fell a victim to his devotion, being slain by a Roman named Publius Decius Mus.

== Bibliography ==
- Monica Berti, "L’antroponimo Megakles sugli ostraka di Atene. Considerazioni prosopografiche, storiche e istituzionali". Minima Epigraphica et Papyrologica 5 (2001), pp. 8-69
- Monica Berti, "‘Megakles, non eretrizzare!’ Una nuova proposta di lettura e d’interpretazione di un ostrakon attico". In Syggraphé. Materiali e appunti per lo studio della storia e della letteratura antica. Ed. D. Ambaglio. Como: Edizioni New Press, 2001, pp. 41-57
