= Ariphron =

Ariphron (/ˈærɪfrɒn/; Ancient Greek: Ἀρίφρων) was the name of several people from ancient Greek history:

- Ariphron, the father of Xanthippus, and grandfather of Pericles, both prominent Athenian statesmen. He was associated with the Alcmaeonid family.
- Ariphron, the brother of Pericles.
- Ariphron of Sicyon, a Greek poet, and the author of a paean to health (Ὑγίεια), which has been preserved by Athenaeus. The beginning of the poem is quoted by Lucian and Maximus of Tyre. It is also printed in Bergk's Poetae Lyrici Graeci.
- Ariphron, an Archon of Athens, reigning in the 9th century BC.
