= Alcibiades =

Athenian general and statesman (c. 450–404 BC)

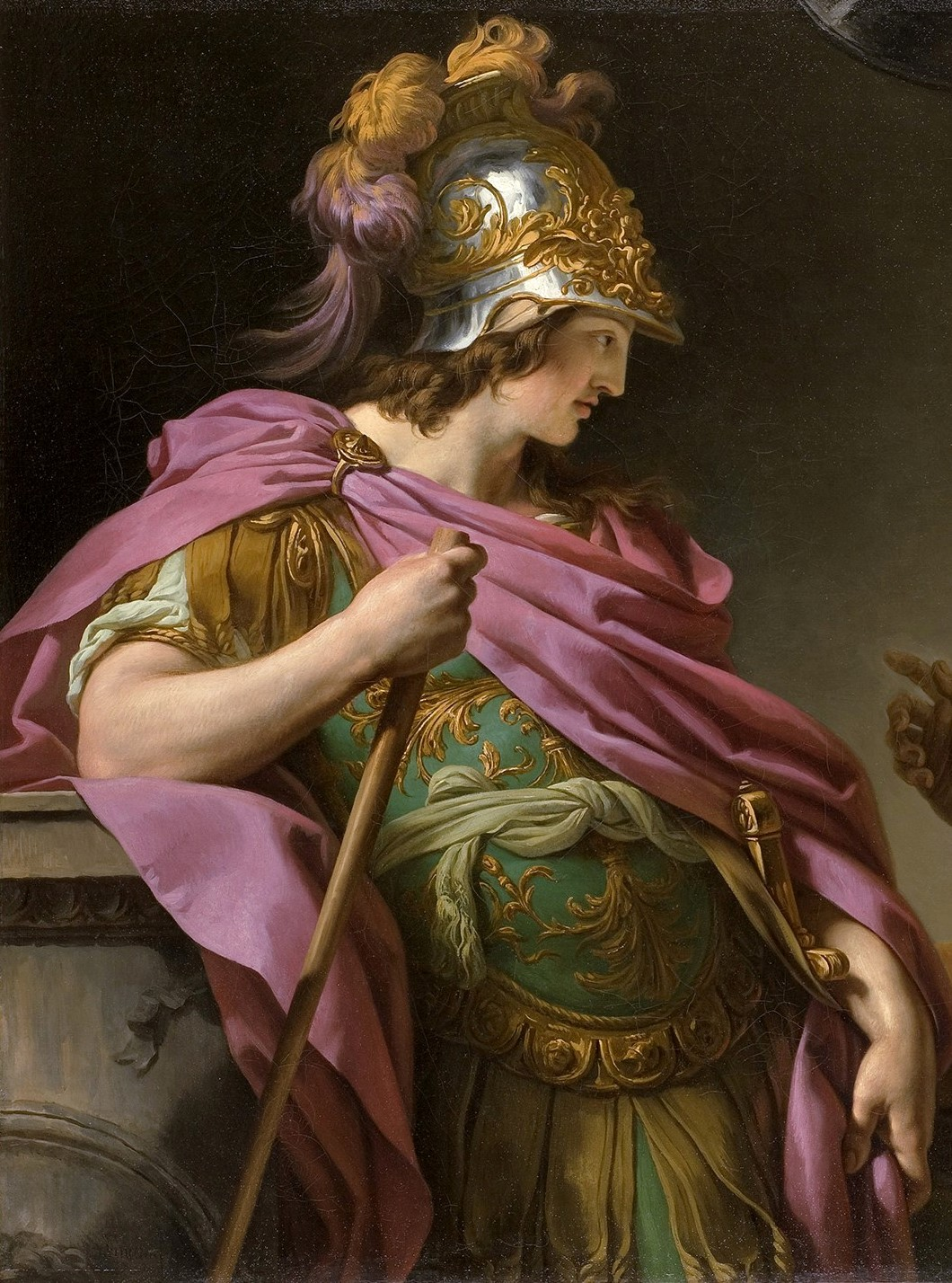
- Detail of Alcibiades Being Taught by Socrates, by François-André Vincent (1777)
- Born: c. 450 BC; Athens
- Died: 404 BC (aged 45–46); Hellespontine Phrygia, Achaemenid Empire
- Spouse: Hipparete
- Partner(s): Timaea, Queen of Sparta; Timandra (? – 404 BC; his death)
- Children: Leotychides of Sparta
- Military career
- Allegiance: Athens (432–415 BC); Sparta (415–412 BC); Persia (412–411 BC)
- Branch: Athenian military (432–415 BC); Spartan army (415–412 BC); Achaemenid military (412–411 BC)
- Rank: Strategos
- Conflicts: Battle of Potidaea; Peloponnesian War; Battle of Delium; Sicilian Expedition; Battle of Abydos; Battle of Cyzicus; Siege of Byzantium

Alcibiades (/ˌælsɪˈbaɪədiːz/; Ancient Greek: Ἀλκιβιάδης; c. 450 – 404 BC) was an Athenian statesman and general. The last of the Alcmaeonidae, he played a major role in the second half of the Peloponnesian War as a strategic advisor, military commander, and politician, but subsequently fell from prominence.

During the course of the Peloponnesian War, Alcibiades changed his political allegiance several times. In his native Athens in the early 410s BC, he advocated an aggressive foreign policy and was a prominent proponent of the Sicilian Expedition. After his political enemies brought charges of sacrilege against him, he fled to Sparta, where he served as a strategic advisor, proposing or supervising several major campaigns against Athens. However, Alcibiades made powerful enemies in Sparta too, and defected to Persia. There he served as an adviser to the satrap Tissaphernes until Athenian political allies brought about his recall. He served as an Athenian general (strategos) for several years, but enemies eventually succeeded in exiling him a second time. He took refuge in Persian territory and was eventually assassinated, reportedly at the instigation of Lysander of Sparta.

Scholars have argued that had the Sicilian expedition been under Alcibiades's command instead of that of Nicias, the expedition might not have met its eventual disastrous fate. In the years when he served Sparta, Alcibiades played a significant role in Athens's undoing; the capture of Decelea and the revolts of several critical Athenian subjects occurred either at his suggestion or under his supervision. Once restored to his native city, however, he played a crucial role in a string of Athenian victories that eventually brought Sparta to seek a peace with Athens. He favored unconventional tactics, frequently winning cities over by treachery or negotiation rather than by siege.

Alcibiades's military and political talents frequently proved valuable to whichever state currently held his allegiance, but his propensity for making powerful enemies ensured that he never remained in one place for long; by the end of the war that he had helped to rekindle in the early 410s, his days of political relevance were a bygone memory. He is also remembered in art and literature as a student of Socrates.

== Early years ==
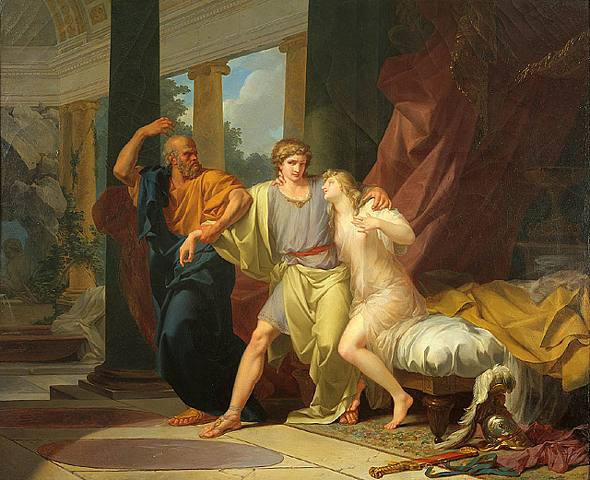
Jean-Baptiste Regnault: Socrates dragging Alcibiades from the Embrace of Sensual Pleasure (1791) (Louvre)

Alcibiades was born in Athens. The family of his father, Cleinias, had old connections with the Spartan aristocracy through a relationship of xenia, and the name "Alcibiades" was of Spartan origin. Alcibiades's mother was Deinomache, the daughter of Megacles, head of the powerful Alcmaeonid family, and could trace her family back to Eurysaces and the Telamonian Ajax. Alcibiades thereby, through his mother, belonged to the powerful and controversial family of the Alcmaeonidae; the renowned Pericles and his brother Ariphron were Deinomache's cousins, as her father and their mother were siblings. His paternal grandfather, also named Alcibiades, was a friend of Cleisthenes, the famous constitutional reformer of the late sixth century BC. After the death of Cleinias at the Battle of Coronea (447 BC), Pericles and Ariphron became his guardians.

According to Plutarch, Alcibiades had several famous teachers, including Socrates, and was well trained in the art of rhetoric. (Note: Isocrates asserts that Alcibiades was never a pupil of Socrates. Thus he does not agree with Plutarch's narration. According to Isocrates, the purpose of this tradition was to accuse Socrates. The rhetorician makes Alcibiades wholly the pupil of Pericles.) He was noted, however, for his unruly behavior, which was mentioned by ancient Greek and Latin writers on several occasions. (Note: According to Plutarch, who is however criticized for using "implausible or unreliable stories" in order to construct Alcibiades's portrait, Alcibiades once wished to see Pericles, but he was told that Pericles could not see him, because he was studying how to render his accounts to the Athenians. "Were it not better for him," said Alcibiades, "to study how not to render his accounts to the Athenians?". Plutarch describes how Alcibiades "gave a box on the ear to Hipponicus, whose birth and wealth made him a person of great influence." This action received much disapproval, since it was "unprovoked by any passion of quarrel between them". To smooth the incident over, Alcibiades went to Hipponicus's house and, after stripping naked, "desired him to scourge and chastise him as he pleased". Hipponicus not only pardoned him but also bestowed upon him the hand of his daughter. Another example of his flamboyant nature occurred during the Olympic games of 416 where "he entered seven teams in the chariot race, more than any private citizen had ever put forward, and three of them came in first, second, and fourth". According to Andocides, once Alcibiades competed against a man named Taureas as choregos of a chorus of boys and "Alcibiades drove off Taureas with his fists. The spectators showed their sympathy with Taureas and their hatred of Alcibiades by applauding the one chorus and refusing to listen to the other at all.") It was believed that Socrates took Alcibiades as a student because he believed he could change Alcibiades from his vain ways. Xenophon attempted to clear Socrates's name at trial by relaying information that Alcibiades was always corrupt and that Socrates merely failed in attempting to teach him morality.

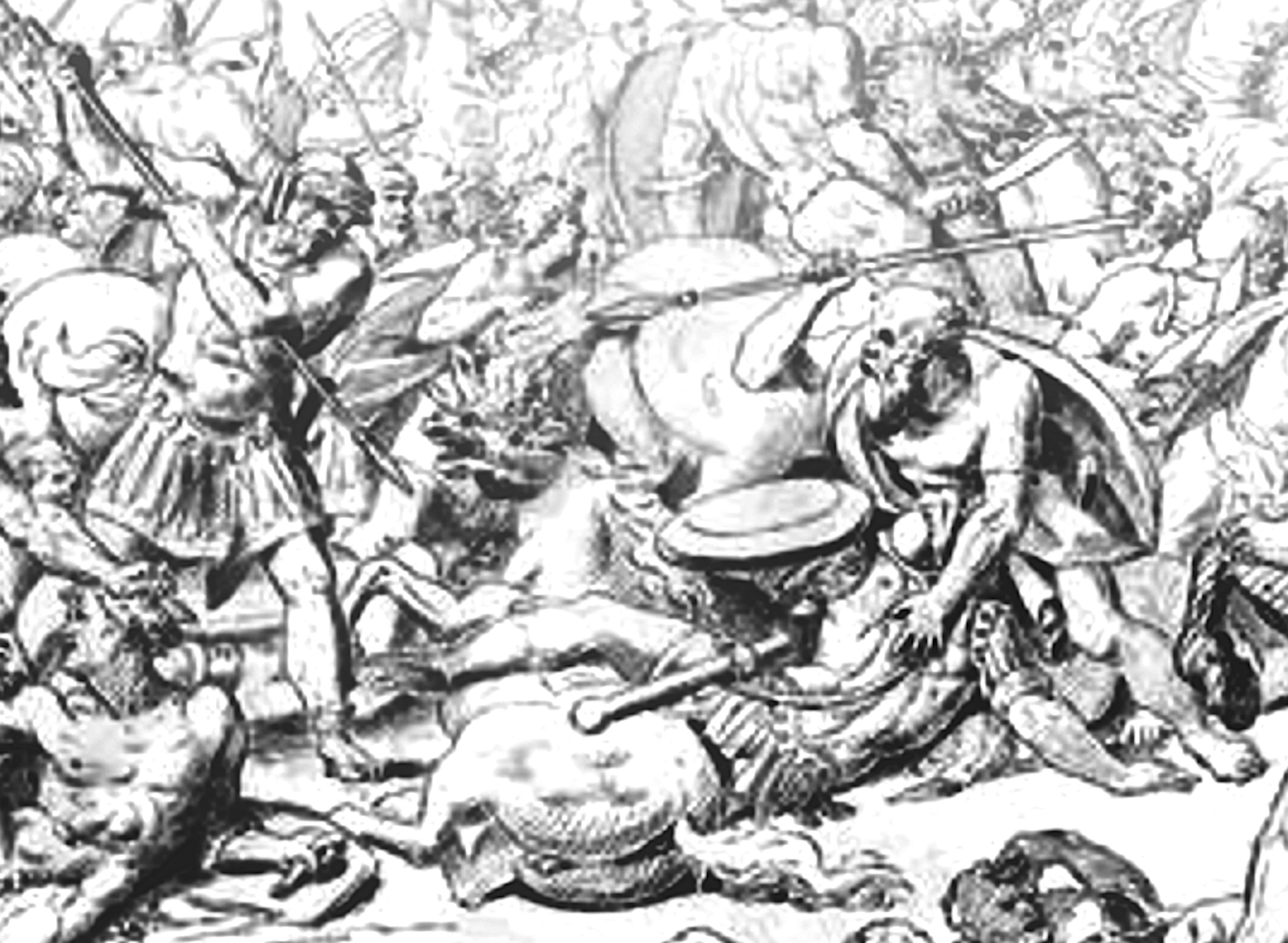
Battle of Potidaea (432 BC): Athenians against Corinthians (detail). Scene of Socrates saving Alcibiades. 18th-century engraving.

Alcibiades took part in the Battle of Potidaea in 432 BC, where Socrates was said to have saved his life. Alcibiades later returned the favour by rescuing Socrates at the Battle of Delium in 424 BC. (Note: Plutarch and Plato agree that Alcibiades "served as a soldier in the campaign of Potidaea and had Socrates for his tentmate and comrade in action" and "when Alcibiades fell wounded, it was Socrates who stood over him and defended him". Nonetheless, Antisthenes insists that Socrates saved Alcibiades at the Battle of Delium.) Alcibiades had a particularly close relationship with Socrates, whom he admired and respected. Plutarch and Plato describe Alcibiades as Socrates's beloved, the former stating that Alcibiades "feared and reverenced Socrates alone, and despised the rest of his lovers".

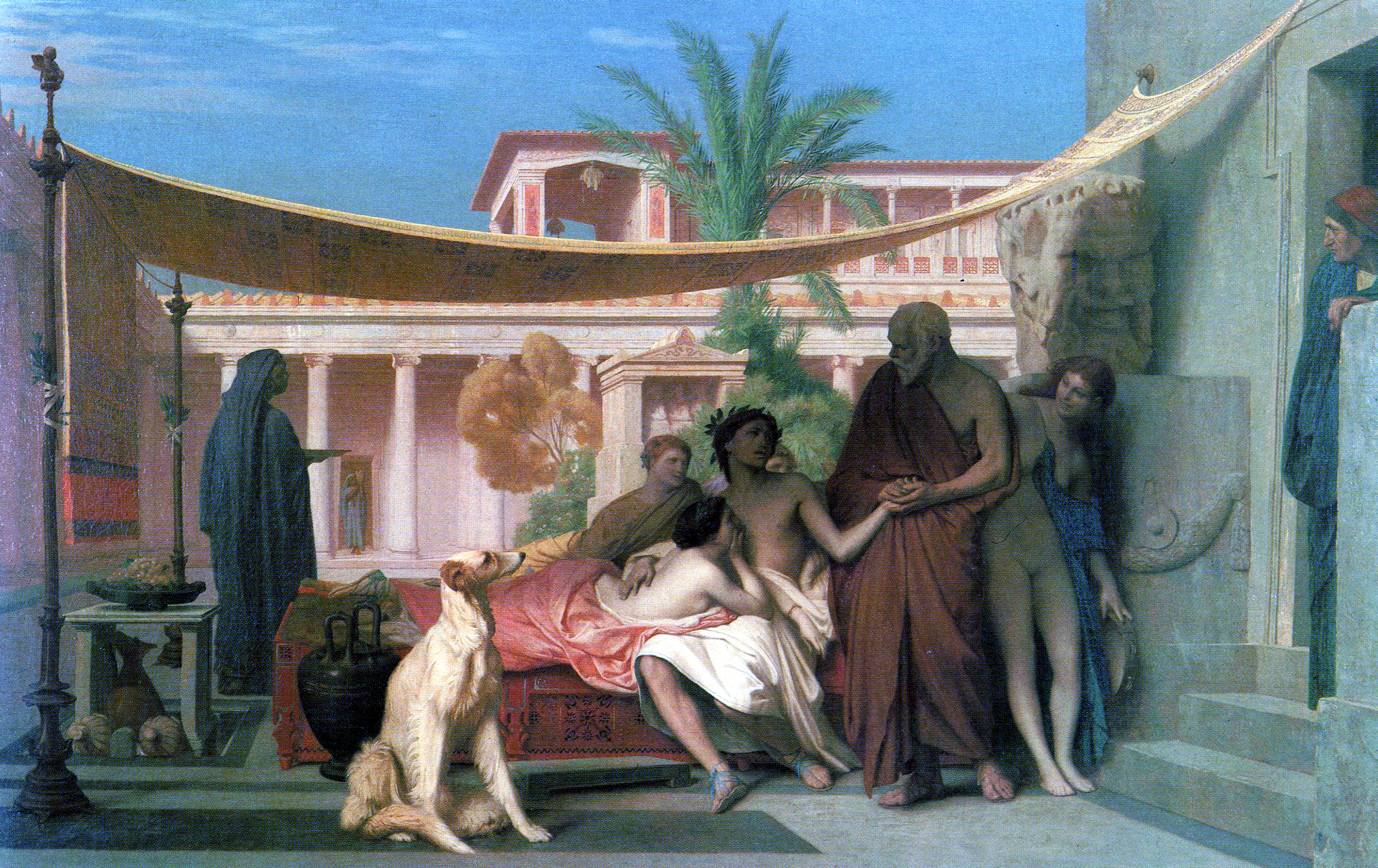
Jean-Léon Gérôme: Socrates seeking Alcibiades in the House of Aspasia (1861)

Alcibiades was married to Hipparete, the daughter of Hipponicus, a wealthy Athenian. His bride brought with her a large dowry, which significantly increased Alcibiades's already substantial family fortune. According to Plutarch, Hipparete loved her husband but attempted to divorce him because he consorted with courtesans, but he prevented her from appearing at court. He seized her in court and carried her home again through the crowded Agora. She lived with him until her death, which came soon after. Alcibiades was famed throughout his life for his physical attractiveness, of which he was inordinately vain.

== Political career in Athens until the Sicilian expedition ==
=== Rise to prominence ===
Alcibiades first rose to prominence when he began advocating aggressive Athenian action after the signing of the Peace of Nicias. That treaty, an uneasy truce between Sparta and Athens signed midway through the Peloponnesian War, came at the end of seven years of fighting during which neither side had gained a decisive advantage. Historians Arnold W. Gomme and Raphael Sealey believe, and Thucydides reports, that Alcibiades was offended that the Spartans had negotiated that treaty through Nicias and Laches, overlooking him on account of his youth.

Disputes over the interpretation of the treaty led the Spartans to dispatch ambassadors to Athens with full powers to arrange all unsettled matters. The Athenians initially received these ambassadors well, but Alcibiades met with them in secret before they were to speak to the ecclesia (the Athenian Assembly) and told them that the Assembly was haughty and had great ambitions. He urged them to renounce their diplomatic authority to represent Sparta, and instead allow him to assist them through his influence in Athenian politics. The representatives agreed and, impressed with Alcibiades, they alienated themselves from Nicias, who genuinely wanted to reach an agreement with the Spartans. The next day, during the Assembly, Alcibiades asked them what powers Sparta had granted them to negotiate and they replied, as agreed, that they had not come with full and independent powers. This was in direct contradiction to what they had said the day before, and Alcibiades seized on this opportunity to denounce their character, cast suspicion on their aims, and destroy their credibility. This ploy increased Alcibiades's standing while embarrassing Nicias, and Alcibiades was subsequently appointed general. He took advantage of his increasing power to orchestrate the creation of an alliance between Argos, Mantinea, Elis, and other states in the Peloponnese, threatening Sparta's dominance in the region. According to Gomme, "it was a grandiose scheme for an Athenian general at the head of a mainly Peloponnesian army to march through the Peloponnese cocking a snook at Sparta when her reputation was at its lowest". This alliance, however, would ultimately be defeated at the Battle of Mantinea.

Somewhere in the years 416–415 BC, a complex struggle took place between Hyperbolos on one side and Nicias and Alcibiades on the other. Hyperbolos tried to bring about the ostracism of one of this pair, but Nicias and Alcibiades combined their influence to induce the people to expel Hyperbolos instead. This incident reveals that Nicias and Alcibiades each commanded a personal following, whose votes were determined by the wishes of the leaders.

Alcibiades was not one of the generals involved in the capture of Melos in 416–415 BC, but Plutarch describes him as a supporter of the decree by which the grown men of Melos were killed and the women and children enslaved. An oration urging Alcibiades's ostracism, "Against Alcibiades" (historically attributed to the orator Andocides but not in fact by him), alleges that Alcibiades had a child by one of these enslaved women.

=== Sicilian Expedition ===
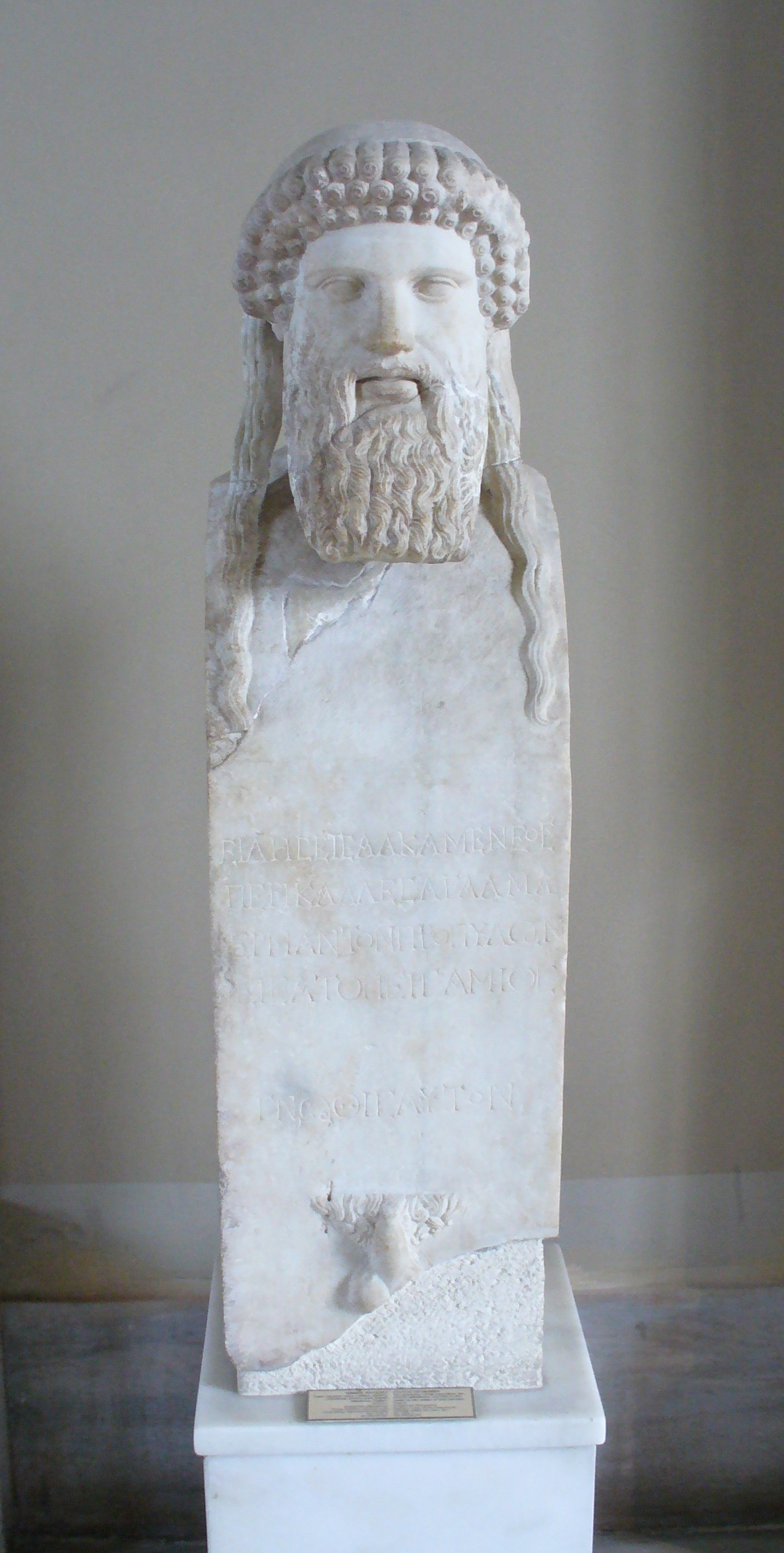
Roman copy of a late fifth-century BC Athenian herma. Vandalizing hermai was one of the crimes of which Alcibiades was accused.

In 415 BC, delegates from the Sicilian city of Segesta (Greek: Egesta) arrived at Athens to plead for the support of the Athenians in their war against Selinus. During the debates on the undertaking, Nicias was vehemently opposed to Athenian intervention, explaining that the campaign would be very costly and attacking the character and motives of Alcibiades, who had emerged as a major supporter of the expedition. In contrast, Alcibiades argued that a campaign in this new theatre would bring riches to the city and expand the empire, just as the Persian Wars had. In his speech Alcibiades predicted (over-optimistically, in the opinion of most historians) that the Athenians would be able to recruit allies in the region and impose their rule on Syracuse, the most powerful city of Sicily. In spite of Alcibiades's enthusiastic advocacy for the plan, it was Nicias, not he, who turned a modest undertaking into a massive campaign and made the conquest of Sicily seem possible and safe. It was at his suggestion that the size of the fleet was significantly increased from 60 ships to "140 galleys, 5,100 men at arms, and about 1300 archers, slingers, and light armed men". Philosopher Leo Strauss underscores that the Sicilian expedition surpassed everything undertaken by Pericles. Almost certainly Nicias's intention was to shock the assembly with his high estimate of the forces required, but, instead of dissuading his fellow citizens, his analysis made them all the more eager. Against his wishes Nicias was appointed general along with Alcibiades and Lamachus, all three of whom were given full powers to do whatever was in the best interests of Athens while in Sicily.

One night during preparations for the expedition, the hermai, heads of the god Hermes on a plinth with a phallus, were mutilated throughout Athens. This was a religious scandal, resulted in a charge of asebeia (impiety) against Alcibiades, and was seen as a bad omen for the mission. Plutarch explains that Androcles, a political leader, used false witnesses who accused Alcibiades and his friends of mutilating the statues, and of profaning the Eleusinian Mysteries. Later his opponents, chief among them being Androcles and Thessalus, Cimon's son, enlisted orators to argue that Alcibiades should set sail as planned and stand trial on his return from the campaign. Alcibiades was suspicious of their intentions, and asked to be allowed to stand trial immediately, under penalty of death, in order to clear his name. This request was denied, and the fleet set sail soon after, with the charges unresolved.

"Men do not rest content with parrying the attacks of a superior, but often strike the first blow to prevent the attack being made. And we cannot fix the exact point at which our empire shall stop; we have reached a position in which we must not be content with retaining but must scheme to extend it, for, if we cease to rule others, we are in danger of being ruled ourselves. Nor can you look at inaction from the same point of view as others, unless you are prepared to change your habits and make them like theirs."
Alcibiades's Oration before the Sicilian expedition, as recorded by Thucydides (VI, 18); Thucydides disclaims verbal accuracy (Note: Thucydides records several speeches which he attributes to Pericles; but Thucydides acknowledges that: "it was in all cases difficult to carry them word for word in one's memory, so my habit has been to make the speakers say what was in my opinion demanded of them by the various occasions, of course adhering as closely as possible to the general sense of what they really said.")

As Alcibiades had suspected, his absence emboldened his enemies, and they began to accuse him of other sacrilegious actions and comments and even alleged that these actions were connected with a plot against the democracy. According to Thucydides, the Athenians were always in fear and took everything suspiciously. When the fleet arrived in Catania, it found the state trireme Salaminia waiting to bring Alcibiades and the others indicted for mutilating the hermai or profaning the Eleusinian Mysteries back to Athens to stand trial. Alcibiades told the heralds that he would follow them back to Athens in his ship, but in Thurii he escaped with his crew; in Athens he was convicted in absentia and condemned to death. His property was confiscated and a reward of one talent was promised to whoever succeeded in killing any who had fled. Meanwhile, the Athenian force in Sicily, after a few early victories, moved against Messina, where the generals expected their secret allies within the city to betray it to them. Alcibiades, however, foreseeing that he would be outlawed, gave information to the friends of the Syracusans in Messina, who succeeded in preventing the admission of the Athenians. With the death of Lamachus in battle some time later, command of the Sicilian Expedition fell into the hands of Nicias, admired by Thucydides (however a modern scholar has judged him to be an inadequate military leader).

== Defection to Sparta ==
After his disappearance at Thurii, Alcibiades quickly contacted the Spartans, "promising to render them aid and service greater than all the harm he had previously done them as an enemy" if they would offer him sanctuary. The Spartans granted this request and received him among them. Because of this defection, the Athenians condemned him to death in absentia and confiscated his property. In the debate at Sparta over whether to send a force to relieve Syracuse, Alcibiades spoke and instilled fear of Athenian ambition into the Spartan ephors by informing them that the Athenians hoped to conquer Sicily, Italy, and even Carthage. Historian Donald Kagan believes that Alcibiades knowingly exaggerated the plans of the Athenians to convince the Spartans of the benefit they stood to gain from his help. Kagan asserts that Alcibiades had not yet acquired his "legendary" reputation, and the Spartans saw him as "a defeated and hunted man" whose policies "produced strategic failures" and brought "no decisive result". If accurate, this assessment underscores one of Alcibiades's greatest talents, his highly persuasive oratory. After making the threat seem imminent, Alcibiades advised the Spartans to send troops and most importantly, a Spartan commander to discipline and aid the Syracusans.

"Our party was that of the whole people, our creed being to do our part in preserving the form of government under which the city enjoyed the utmost greatness and freedom, and which we had found existing. As for democracy, the men of sense among us knew what it was, and I perhaps as well as any, as I have the more cause to complain of it; but there is nothing new to be said of a patent absurdity—meanwhile we did not think it safe to alter it under the pressure of your hostility."
Alcibiades's Speech to the Spartans, as recorded by Thucydides (VI, 89); Thucydides disclaims verbal accuracy

Alcibiades served as a military adviser to Sparta and helped the Spartans secure several crucial successes. He advised them to build a permanent fort at Decelea, just over ten miles (16 km) from Athens and within sight of the city. By doing this, the Spartans cut the Athenians off entirely from their homes and crops and the silver mines of Sunium. This was part of Alcibiades's plan to renew the war with Athens in Attica. The move was devastating to Athens and forced the citizens to live within the long walls of the city year round, making them entirely dependent on their seaborne trade for food. Seeing Athens thus beleaguered on a second front, members of the Delian League began to contemplate revolt. In the wake of Athens's disastrous defeat in Sicily, Alcibiades sailed to Ionia with a Spartan fleet and succeeded in persuading several critical cities to revolt.

In spite of these valuable contributions to the Spartan cause, around this time Alcibiades fell out of favor with the government of King Agis II. Leotychides, the son born by Agis's wife Timaea, Queen of Sparta (or Queen Timonassa), shortly after this, was believed by many to be Alcibiades's son. An alternate account asserts that Alcibiades took advantage of King Agis's absence with the Spartan army in Attica and seduced his wife.

Alcibiades's influence was further reduced after the retirement of Endius, the ephor who was on good terms with him. It is alleged that Astyochus, a Spartan admiral, was sent orders to kill him, but Alcibiades received warning of this order and defected to the Persian satrap Tissaphernes, who had been supporting the Peloponnesian forces financially in 412 BC.

== Defection to Achaemenid Empire in Asia Minor ==
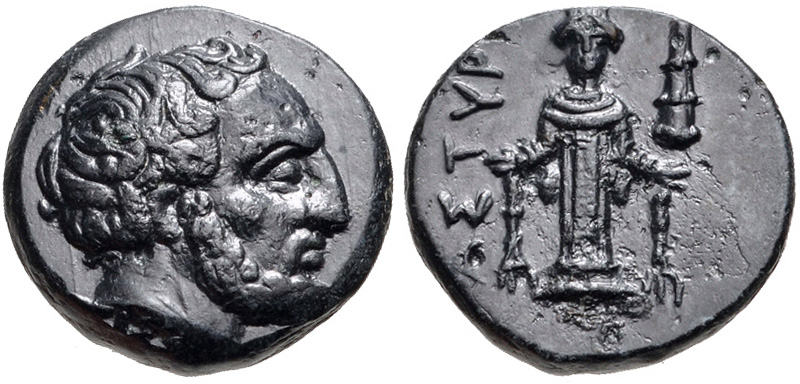
Coinage of Achaemenid Satrap Tissaphernes, who received Alcibiades as an advisor. Astyra, Mysia. Circa 400–395 BC

On his arrival in the local Persian court, Alcibiades won the trust of the powerful satrap and made several policy suggestions which were well received. According to Thucydides, Alcibiades immediately began to do all he could with Tissaphernes to injure the Peloponnesian cause. At his urging, the satrap reduced the payments he was making to the Peloponnesian fleet and began delivering them irregularly. Alcibiades next advised Tissaphernes to bribe the generals of the cities to gain valuable intelligence on their activities. Lastly, and most importantly, he told the satrap to be in no hurry to bring the Persian fleet into the conflict, as the longer the war dragged out the more exhausted the combatants would become. This would allow the Persians to more easily conquer the region in the aftermath of the fighting. Alcibiades tried to convince the satrap that it was in Persia's interest to wear both Athens and Sparta out at first, "and after docking the Athenian power as much as he could, forthwith to rid the country of the Peloponnesians".

Although Alcibiades's advice benefited the Persians, it was merely a means to an end; Thucydides tells us that his real motive was to use his alleged influence with the Persians to effect his restoration to Athens. Alcibiades was one of several Greek aristocrats who took refuge in the Achaemenid Empire following reversals at home, other famous ones being Themistocles, Demaratos or Gongylos. According to Thucydides (Thuc.8.47), Alcibiades also advised the Achaemenid king (Darius II), and therefore he may have traveled to Susa or Babylonia to encounter him.

== Recall to Athens ==
=== Negotiations with the Athenian oligarchs ===
Alcibiades seemed to assume that the "radical democracy" would never agree to his recall to Athens. He exchanged messages with the Athenian leaders at Samos and suggested that if they could install an oligarchy friendly to him he would return to Athens and bring with him Persian money and possibly the Persian fleet of 147 triremes. Alcibiades set about winning over the most influential military officers, and achieved his goal by offering them a threefold plan: the Athenian constitution was to be changed, the recall of Alcibiades was to be voted, and Alcibiades was to win over Tissaphernes and the King of Persia to the Athenian side. Most of the officers in the Athenian fleet accepted the plan and welcomed the prospect of a narrower constitution, which would allow them a greater part in determining policy. According to Thucydides, only one of the Athenian generals at Samos, Phrynichus, opposed the plan and argued that Alcibiades cared no more for the proposed oligarchy than for the traditional democracy. The involvement in the plot of another general, Thrasybulus, remains unclear. (Note: Kagan has suggested that Thrasybulus was one of the founding members of the scheme and was willing to support moderate oligarchy, but was alienated by the extreme actions taken by the plotters. Robert J. Buck, on the other hand, maintains that Thrasybulus was probably never involved in the plot, possibly because he was absent from Samos at the time of its inception.)

These officers of the Athenian fleet formed a group of conspirators, but were met with opposition from the majority of the soldiers and sailors; these were eventually calmed down "by the advantageous prospect of the pay from the king". The members of the group assembled and prepared to send Pisander, one of their number, on an embassy to Athens to treat for the restoration of Alcibiades and the abolition of democracy in the city, and thus to make Tissaphernes the friend of the Athenians.

Phrynichus, fearing that Alcibiades if restored would avenge himself upon him for his opposition, sent a secret letter to the Spartan Admiral, Astyochus, to tell him that Alcibiades was ruining their cause by making Tissaphernes the friend of the Athenians, and containing an express revelation of the rest of the intrigue. Astyochus went up to Alcibiades and Tissaphernes at Magnesia and communicated to them Phrynichus's letter. Alcibiades responded in kind, sending to the authorities at Samos a letter against Phrynichus, stating what he had done, and requiring that he should be put to death. Phrynichus in desperation wrote again to Astyochus, offering him a chance to destroy the Athenian fleet at Samos. This also Astyochus revealed to Alcibiades who informed the officers at Samos that they had been betrayed by Phrynichus. Alcibiades however gained no credit, because Phrynichus had anticipated Alcibiades's letter and, before the accusations could arrive, told the army that he had received information of an enemy plan to attack the camp and that they should fortify Samos as quickly as possible.

Despite these events, Pisander and the other envoys of the conspirators arrived at Athens and made a speech before the people. Pisander won the argument, putting Alcibiades and his promises at the center. The Ecclesia deposed Phrynichus and elected Pisander and ten other envoys to negotiate with Tissaphernes and Alcibiades.

At this point, Alcibiades's scheme encountered a great obstacle. Tissaphernes would not make an agreement on any terms, wanting to follow his policy of neutrality. As Kagan points out, Tissaphernes was a prudent leader and had recognized the advantages of wearing each side out without direct Persian involvement. Alcibiades realized this and, by presenting the Athenians with stiffer and stiffer demands on Tissaphernes's behalf, attempted to convince them that he had persuaded Tissaphernes to support them, but that they had not conceded enough to him. Although the envoys were angered at the audacity of the Persian demands, they nevertheless departed with the impression that Alcibiades could have brought about an agreement among the powers if he had chosen to do so. This fiasco at the court of Tissaphernes, however, put an end to the negotiations between the conspirators and Alcibiades. The group was convinced that Alcibiades could not deliver his side of the bargain without demanding exorbitantly high concessions of them and they accordingly abandoned their plans to restore him to Athens.

=== Reinstatement as an Athenian general ===
In spite of the failure of the negotiations, the conspirators succeeded in overthrowing the democracy and imposing the oligarchic government of the Four Hundred, among the leaders of which were Phrynichus and Pisander. At Samos, however, a similar coup instigated by the conspirators did not go forward so smoothly. Samian democrats learned of the conspiracy and notified four prominent Athenians: the generals Leon and Diomedon, the trierarch Thrasybulus, and Thrasyllus, at that time a hoplite in the ranks. With the support of these men and the Athenian soldiers in general, the Samian democrats were able to defeat the 300 Samian oligarchs who attempted to seize power there. Further, the Athenian troops at Samos formed themselves into a political assembly, deposed their generals, and elected new ones, including Thrasybulus and Thrasyllus. The army, stating that they had not revolted from the city but that the city had revolted from them, resolved to stand by the democracy while continuing to prosecute the war against Sparta.

After a time, Thrasybulus persuaded the assembled troops to vote Alcibiades's recall, a policy that he had supported since before the coup. Then he sailed to retrieve Alcibiades and returned with him to Samos. The aim of this policy was to win away Persian support from the Spartans, as it was still believed that Alcibiades had great influence with Tissaphernes. Plutarch claims that the army sent for Alcibiades so as to use his help in putting down the tyrants in Athens. Kagan argues that this reinstatement was a disappointment to Alcibiades, who had hoped for a glorious return to Athens itself but found himself only restored to the rebellious fleet, where the immunity from prosecution he had been granted "protected him for the time being but not from a reckoning in the future"; furthermore, the recall, which Alcibiades had hoped to bring about through his own prestige and perceived influence, was achieved through the patronage of Thrasybulus.

In his first speech to the assembled troops, Alcibiades complained bitterly about the circumstances of his exile, but most of the speech was boasting of his influence with Tissaphernes. The primary motives of his speech were to make the oligarchs at Athens fear him and to increase his credit with the army at Samos. Upon hearing his speech the troops immediately elected him general alongside Thrasybulus and the others. He roused them so much that they proposed to sail at once for Piraeus and attack the oligarchs in Athens. It was primarily Alcibiades, along with Thrasybulus, who calmed the people and showed them the folly of this proposal, which would have sparked civil war and would have led to the immediate defeat of Athens. Shortly after Alcibiades's reinstatement as an Athenian general, the government of the Four Hundred was overthrown and replaced by a broader oligarchy, which would eventually give way to democracy.

Presently Alcibiades sailed to Tissaphernes with a detachment of ships. According to Plutarch, the supposed purpose of this mission was to stop the Persian fleet from coming to the aid of the Peloponnesians. Thucydides is in agreement with Plutarch that the Persian fleet was at Aspendus and that Alcibiades told the troops he would bring the fleet to their side or prevent it from coming at all, but Thucydides further speculates that the real reason was to flaunt his new position to Tissaphernes and try to gain some real influence over him. According to the historian, Alcibiades had long known that Tissaphernes never meant to bring the fleet at all.

=== Battles of Abydos and Cyzicus ===
The Athenian strategy at Cyzicus. Left: Alcibiades's decoy force (blue) lures the Spartan fleet (black) out to sea. Right: Thrasybulus and Theramenes bring their squadrons in behind the Spartans to cut off their retreat towards Cyzicus, while Alcibiades turns to face the pursuing force.

Alcibiades was recalled by the "intermediate regime" of The Five Thousand, the government which succeeded the Four Hundred in 411, but it is most likely that he waited until 407 BC to actually return to the city. Plutarch tells us that, although his recall had already been passed on motion of Critias, a political ally of his, Alcibiades was resolved to come back with glory. While this was certainly his goal, it was again a means to an end, that end being to avoid prosecution upon his return to Athens.

The next significant part he would play in the war would occur at the Battle of Abydos. Alcibiades had remained behind at Samos with a small force while Thrasybulus and Thrasyllus led the greater part of the fleet to the Hellespont. During this period, Alcibiades succeeded in raising money from Caria and the neighboring area, with which he was able to pay the rowers and gain their favor. After the Athenian victory at Cynossema, both fleets summoned all their ships from around the Aegean to join them for what might be a decisive next engagement. While Alcibiades was still en route, the Athenians fought off the arrival of the Rhodian admiral Dorieus who appeared with 14 ships and was forced into Rhoeteium. The Spartans sailed to assist him and the two fleets clashed at Abydos, where the Peloponnesians had set up their main naval base. The battle was evenly matched, and raged for a long time, but the balance tipped towards the Athenians when Alcibiades sailed into the Hellespont with eighteen triremes. The Persian satrap Pharnabazus, who had replaced Tissaphernes as the sponsor of the Peloponnesian fleet, moved his land army to the shore to defend the ships and sailors who had beached their ships. Only the support of the Persian land army and the coming of night saved the Peloponnesian fleet from complete destruction.

Shortly after the battle, Tissaphernes had arrived in the Hellespont and Alcibiades left the fleet at Sestos to meet him, bringing gifts and hoping once again to try to win over the Persian governor. Evidently Alcibiades had gravely misjudged his standing with the satrap, and he was arrested on arrival. Within a month he would escape with another Athenian, Mantitheos, and resume command. It was now obvious, however, that he had no influence with the Persians; from now on his authority would depend on what he actually could accomplish rather than on what he promised to do.

After an interlude of several months in which the Peloponnesians constructed new ships and the Athenians besieged cities and raised money throughout the Aegean, the next major sea battle took place the spring of 410 BC at Cyzicus. Alcibiades had been forced to flee from Sestos to Cardia to protect his small fleet from the rebuilt Peloponnesian navy, but as soon as the Athenian fleet was reunited there its commanders led it to Cyzicus, where the Athenians had intelligence indicating that Pharnabazus and Mindarus, the Peloponnesian fleet commander, were together plotting their next move. Concealed by storm and darkness, the combined Athenian force reached the vicinity without being spotted by the Peloponnesians. Here the Athenians devised a plot to draw the enemy into battle. According to Diodorus Siculus, Alcibiades advanced with a small squadron in order to draw the Spartans out to battle, and, after he successfully deceived Mindarus with this ploy, the squadrons of Thrasybulus and Theramenes came to join him, cutting off the Spartans' retreat. (Note: In the case of the battle of Cyzicus, Robert J. Littman, professor at Brandeis University, points out the different accounts given by Xenophon and Diodorus. According to Xenophon, Alcibiades's victory was due to the luck of a rainstorm, while, according to Diodorus, it was due to a carefully conceived plan. Although most historians prefer the accounts of Xenophon, Jean Hatzfeld remarks that Diodorus's accounts contain many interesting and unique details.)

The Spartan fleet suffered losses in the flight and reached the shore with the Athenians in close pursuit. Alcibiades's troops, leading the Athenian pursuit, landed and attempted to pull the Spartan ships back out to sea. The Peloponnesians fought to prevent their ships from being towed away, and Pharnabazus's troops came up to support them. Thrasybulus landed his own force to temporarily relieve pressure on Alcibiades, and meanwhile ordered Theramenes to join up with Athenian land forces nearby and bring them to reinforce the sailors and marines on the beach. The Spartans and Persians, overwhelmed by the arrival of multiple forces from several directions, were defeated and driven off, and the Athenians captured all the Spartan ships which were not destroyed. A letter dispatched to Sparta by Hippocrates, vice-admiral under Mindarus, was intercepted and taken to Athens; it ran as follows: "The ships are lost. Mindarus is dead. The men are starving. We know not what to do". A short time later Sparta petitioned for peace, but their appeals were ultimately rejected by the Athenians.

=== Further military successes ===
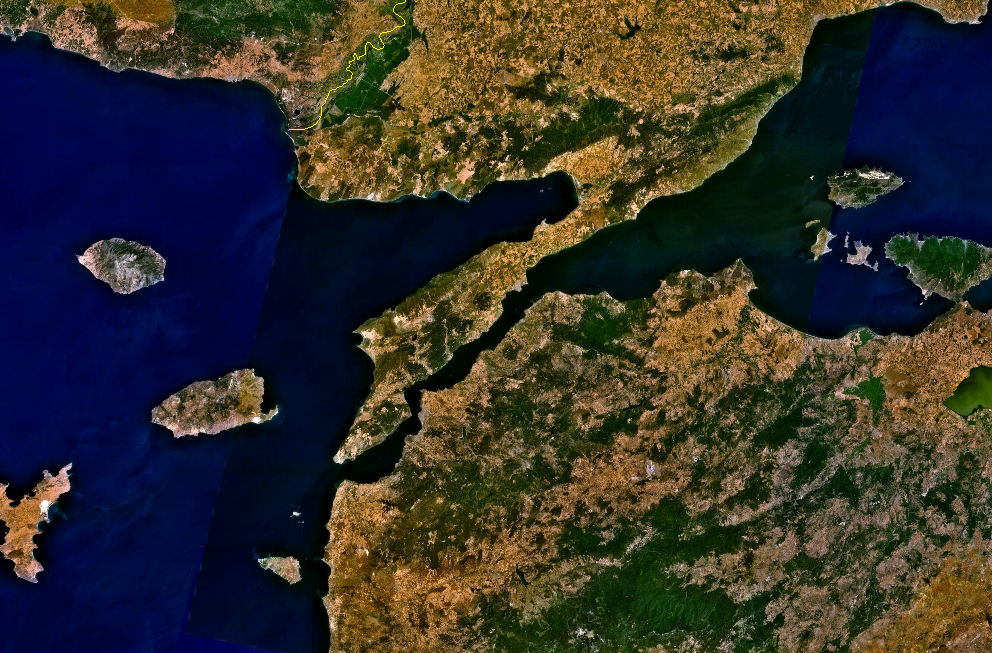
Satellite image of the Thracian Chersonese (now known as the Gallipoli Peninsula) and surrounding area. Alcibiades traveled to the Chersonese in 408 BC and attacked the city of Selymbria on the north shore of the Propontis.

After their victory, Alcibiades and Thrasybulus began the siege of Chalcedon in 409 BC with about 190 ships. Although unable to attain a decisive victory or induce the city to surrender, Alcibiades was able to win a small tactical land battle outside of the city gates and Theramenes concluded an agreement with the Chalcedonians. Afterwards they concluded a temporary alliance with Pharnabazus which secured some much needed immediate cash for the army, but despite this Alcibiades was still forced to depart in search for more booty to pay the soldiers and oarsmen of the fleet.

In pursuit of these funds he traveled to the Thracian Chersonese and attacked Selymbria. He plotted with a pro-Athenian party within the city and offered the Selymbrians reasonable terms, imposing strict discipline on his men to see that they were observed. He did the Selymbrians's city no injury whatsoever, but merely took a sum of money from it, set a garrison there and left. Epigraphical evidence indicates the Selymbrians surrendered hostages until the treaty was ratified in Athens. His performance is judged as skillful by historians, since it saved time, resources, and lives and still fully achieved his goal.

From here Alcibiades joined in the siege of Byzantium along with Theramenes and Thrasyllus. A portion of the citizens of the city, demoralized and hungry, decided to surrender the city to Alcibiades for similar terms as the Selymbrians had received. On the designated night the defenders left their posts, and the Athenians attacked the Peloponnesian garrison in the city and their boats in the harbor. The portion of the citizenry that remained loyal to the Peloponnesians fought so savagely that Alcibiades issued a statement in the midst of the fighting which guaranteed their safety and this persuaded the remaining citizens to turn against the Peloponnesian garrison, which was nearly totally destroyed.

== Exile and death ==
=== Return to Athens ===
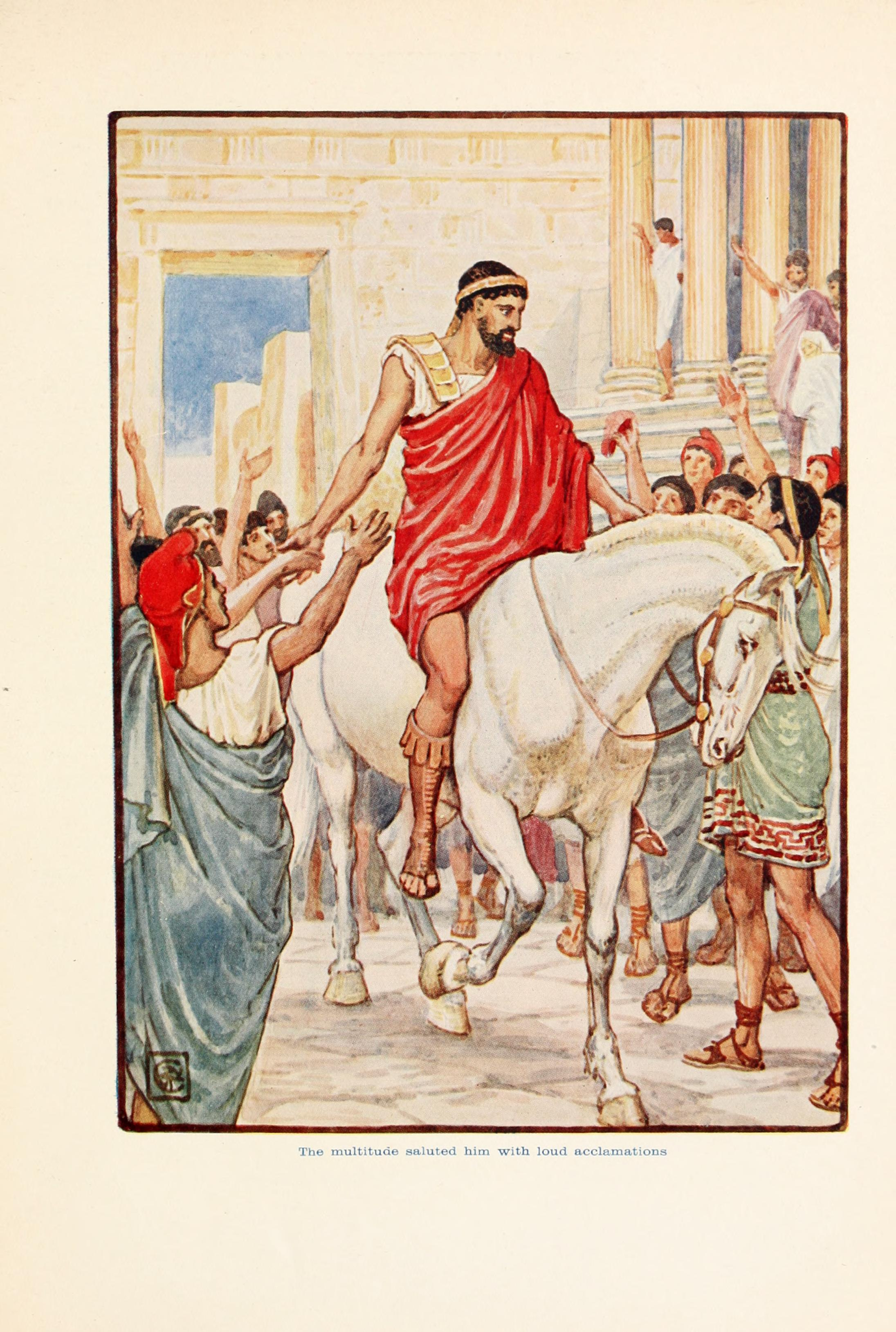
Alcibiades returns in triumph to Athens; illustration from a 1910s history textbook.

It was in the aftermath of these successes that Alcibiades resolved to finally return to Athens in the spring of 407 BC. Even in the wake of his recent victories, Alcibiades was exceedingly careful in his return, mindful of the changes in government, the charges still technically hanging over him, and the great injury he had done to Athens. Thus Alcibiades, rather than going straight home, first went to Samos to pick up 20 ships and proceeded with them to the Ceramic Gulf where he collected 100 talents. He finally sailed to Gytheion to make inquiries, partly about the reported preparations of the Spartans there, and partly about the feelings in Athens regarding his return. His inquiries assured him that the city was kindly disposed towards him and that his closest friends urged him to return.

Therefore, he finally sailed into Piraeus where the crowd had gathered, desiring to see the famous Alcibiades. He entered the harbor full of fear until he saw his cousin and others of his friends and acquaintances, who invited him to land. Upon arriving on shore he was greeted with a hero's welcome. Nevertheless, some saw an evil omen in the fact that he had returned to Athens on the very day when the ceremony of the Plynteria (the feast where the old statue of Athena would get cleansed) was being celebrated. This was regarded as the unluckiest day of the year to undertake anything of importance. His enemies took note of this and kept it in mind for a future occasion.

All the criminal proceedings against him were canceled and the charges of blasphemy were officially withdrawn. Alcibiades was able to assert his piety and to raise Athenian morale by leading the solemn procession to Eleusis (for the celebration of the Eleusinian Mysteries) by land for the first time since the Spartans had occupied Decelea. The procession had been replaced by a sea voyage, but this year Alcibiades used a detachment of soldiers to escort the traditional procession. His property was restored and the ecclesia elected him supreme commander of land and sea (strategos autokrator).

=== Defeat at Notium ===
In 406 BC Alcibiades set out from Athens with 1,500 hoplites and a hundred ships. He failed to take Andros and then he went on to Samos. Later he moved to Notium, closer to the enemy at Ephesus. Meanwhile, Tissaphernes had been replaced by Cyrus the Younger (son of Darius II of Persia) who decided to financially support the Peloponnesians. This new revenue started to attract Athenian deserters to the Spartan navy. Additionally the Spartans had replaced Mindarus with Lysander, a very capable admiral. These factors caused the rapid growth of the Peloponnesian fleet at the expense of the Athenian. In search of funds and needing to force another decisive battle, Alcibiades left Notium and sailed to help Thrasybulus in the siege of Phocaea. Alcibiades was aware the Spartan fleet was nearby, so he left nearly eighty ships to watch them under the command of his personal helmsman Antiochus, who was given express orders not to attack. Antiochus disobeyed this single order and endeavored to draw Lysander into a fight by imitating the tactics used at Cyzicus. The situation at Notium, however, was radically different from that at Cyzicus; the Athenians possessed no element of surprise, and Lysander had been well informed about their fleet by deserters. Antiochus's ship was sunk, and he was killed by a sudden Spartan attack; the remaining ships of the decoy force were then chased headlong back toward Notium, where the main Athenian force was caught unprepared by the sudden arrival of the whole Spartan fleet. In the ensuing fighting, Lysander gained an entire victory. Alcibiades soon returned and desperately tried to undo the defeat at Notium by scoring another victory, but Lysander could not be compelled to attack the fleet again.

Responsibility for the defeat ultimately fell on Alcibiades, and his enemies used the opportunity to attack him and have him removed from command, although some modern scholars believe that Alcibiades was unfairly blamed for Antiochus's mistake. Diodorus reports that, in addition to his mistake at Notium, Alcibiades was discharged on account of false accusations brought against him by his enemies. According to historian Antony Andrewes, the extravagant hopes that his successes of the previous summer had created were a decisive element in his downfall. Consequently, Alcibiades condemned himself to exile. Never again returning to Athens, he sailed north to the castles in the Thracian Chersonese, which he had secured during his time in the Hellespont. The implications of the defeat were severe for Athens. Although the defeat had been minor, it occasioned the removal of not only Alcibiades but also his allies such as Thrasybulus, Theramenes, and Critias. These were likely the most capable commanders Athens had at the time, and their removal would help lead to the Athenian surrender only two years later, after their complete defeat at Aegospotami.

=== Death ===
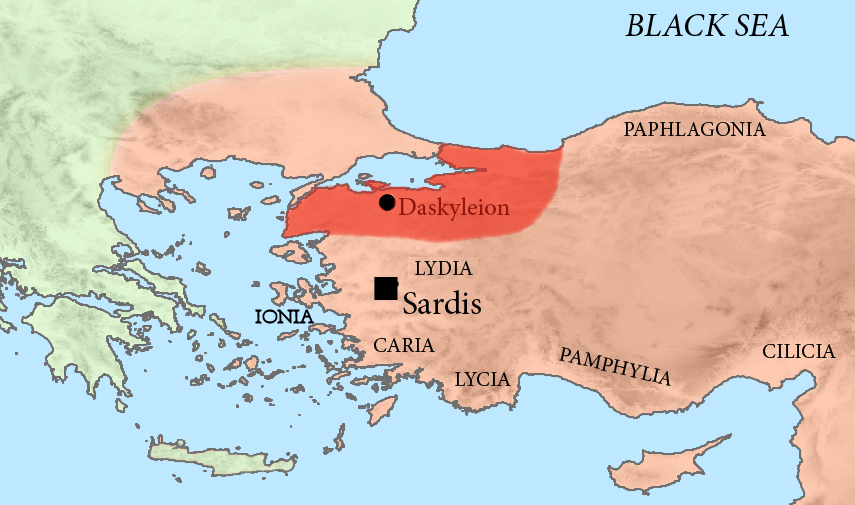
Alcibiades finished his days in Hellespontine Phrygia, an Achaemenid Empire satrapy ruled by Satrap Pharnabazus II.

With one exception, Alcibiades's role in the war ended with his command. Prior to the Battle of Aegospotami, in the last attested fact of his career, Alcibiades recognized that the Athenians were anchored in a tactically disadvantageous spot and advised them to move to Sestus where they could benefit from a harbor and a city. Diodorus, however, does not mention this advice, arguing instead that Alcibiades offered the generals Thracian aid in exchange for a share in the command. (Note: Plutarch mentions Alcibiades's advice, writing that "he rode up on horseback and read the generals a lesson. He said their anchorage was a bad one; the place had no harbor and no city, but they had to get their supplies from Sestos". B. Perrin regards Xenophon's testimony as impeachable and prefers Diodorus's account. According to A. Wolpert, "it would not have required a cynical reader to infer even from Xenophon's account that he (Alcibiades) was seeking to promote his own interests when he came forward to warn the generals about their tactical mistakes".) In any case, the generals of the Athenians, "considering that in case of defeat the blame would attach to them and that in case of success all men would attribute it to Alcibiades", asked him to leave and not come near the camp ever again. Days later the fleet would be annihilated by Lysander.

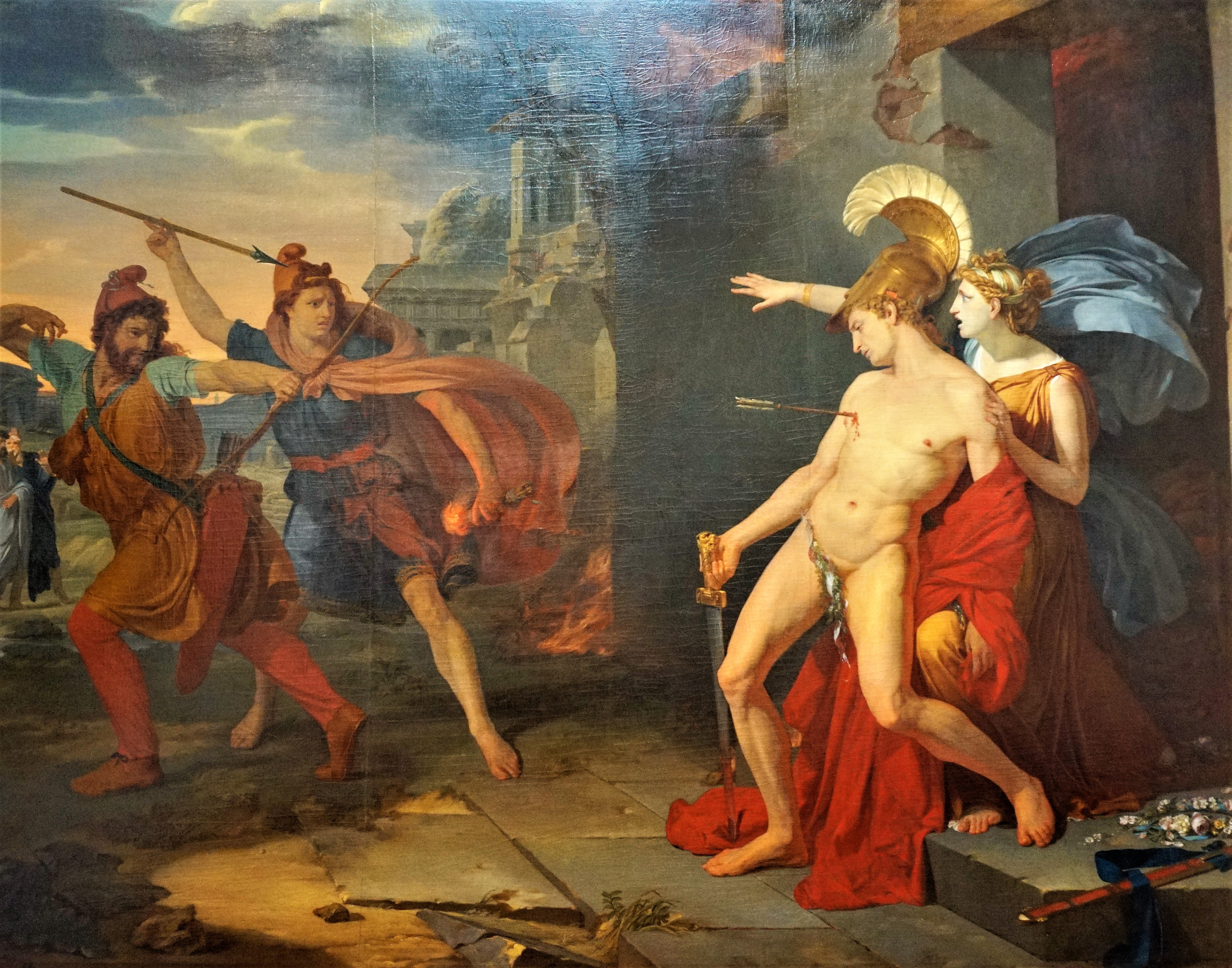
In 404 BC, Alcibiades, exiled in the Achaemenid Empire province of Hellespontine Phrygia, was assassinated by Persian soldiers, who may have been following the orders of Satrap Pharnabazus II, at the instigation of Sparta. La mort d'Alcibiade. Philippe Chéry, 1791. Musée des Beaux-Arts, La Rochelle.

After the Battle of Aegospotami, Alcibiades crossed the Hellespont and took refuge in Hellespontine Phrygia, with the object of securing the aid of the Achaemenid King Artaxerxes against Sparta. Alcibiades was one of several Greek aristocrats who took refuge in the Achaemenid Empire following reversals at home, other famous ones being Themistocles, Hippias, Demaratos and Gongylos. For the most part, they were generously welcomed by the Achaemenid kings, and received land grants to support them, and ruled in various cities of Asia Minor.

Much about the circumstances of Alcibiades's death is uncertain, as there are conflicting accounts. According to the oldest of these, the Spartans and specifically Lysander were responsible. Though many of his details cannot be independently corroborated, Plutarch's version is that Lysander sent an envoy to Pharnabazus who then dispatched his brother to Phrygia where Alcibiades was living with his mistress, Timandra. (Note: According to Plutarch, some say that Alcibiades himself provoked his death, because he had seduced a girl belonging to a well-known family. Thus there are two versions of the story: The assassins were probably either employed by the Spartans or by the brothers of the lady whom Alcibiades had seduced. According to Isocrates, when the Thirty Tyrants established their rule, all Greece became unsafe for Alcibiades.)

In 404 BC, as he was about to set out for the Persian court, his residence was surrounded and set on fire. Seeing no chance of escape he rushed out on his assassins, dagger in hand, and was killed by a shower of arrows. According to Aristotle, the site of Alcibiades's death was Elaphus, a mountain in Phrygia.

== Assessments ==
=== Political career ===
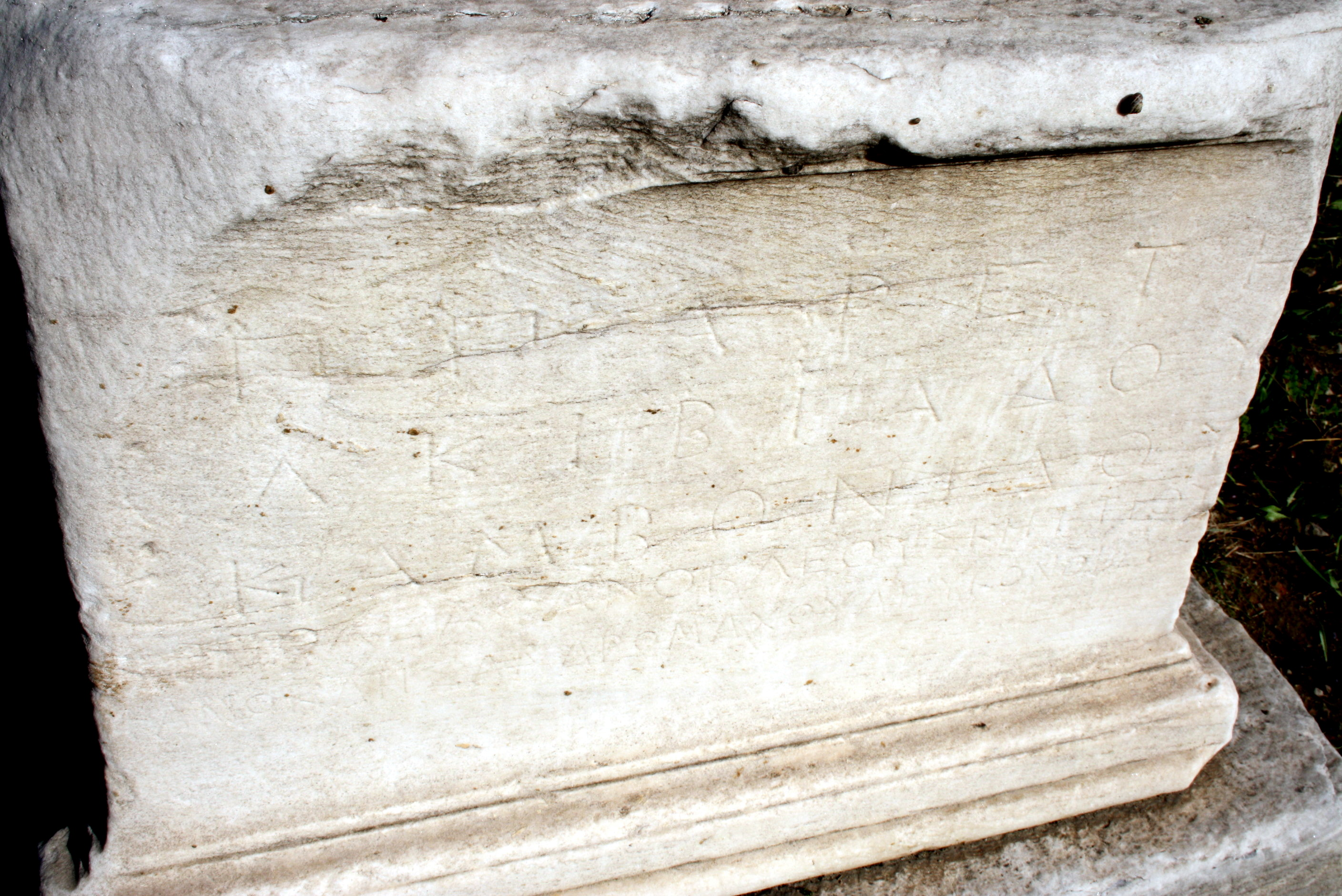
Epitaph for Hipparete, daughter of Alcibiades (Kerameikos Cemetery, Athens).

In ancient Greece, Alcibiades was a polarizing figure. According to Thucydides, Alcibiades, being "exceedingly ambitious", proposed the expedition in Sicily in order "to gain in wealth and reputation by means of his successes". Alcibiades is not held responsible by Thucydides for the destruction of Athens, since "his habits gave offence to every one, and caused the Athenians to commit affairs to other hands, and thus before long to ruin the city". Plutarch regards him as "the least scrupulous and most entirely careless of human beings". On the other hand, Diodorus argues that he was "in spirit brilliant and intent upon great enterprises". Sharon Press of Brown University points out that Xenophon emphasizes Alcibiades's service to the state, rather than the harm he was charged with causing it. Demosthenes defends Alcibiades's achievements, saying that he had taken arms in the cause of democracy, displaying his patriotism, not by gifts of money or by speeches, but by personal service. For Demosthenes and other orators, Alcibiades epitomized the figure of the great man during the glorious days of the Athenian democracy and became a rhetorical symbol. One of Isocrates's speeches, delivered by Alcibiades the Younger, argues that the statesman deserved the Athenians' gratitude for the service he had given them. Lysias, on the other hand, argued in one of his orations that the Athenians should regard Alcibiades as an enemy because of the general tenor of his life, as "he repays with injury the open assistance of any of his friends". In the Constitution of the Athenians, Aristotle does not include Alcibiades in the list of the best Athenian politicians, but in Posterior Analytics he argues that traits of a proud man like Alcibiades are "equanimity amid the vicissitudes of life and impatience of dishonor". Alcibiades excited in his contemporaries a fear for the safety of the political order. Therefore, Andocides said of him that "instead of holding that he ought himself to conform with the laws of the state, he expects you to conform with his own way of life". Central to the depiction of the Athenian statesman is Cornelius Nepos's famous phrase that Alcibiades "surpassed all the Athenians in grandeur and magnificence of living".

Even today, Alcibiades divides scholars. For Malcolm F. McGregor, former head of the Department of Classics in the University of British Columbia, Alcibiades was rather a shrewd gambler than a mere opportunist. Evangelos P. Fotiadis, a prominent Greek philologist, asserts that Alcibiades was "a first class diplomat" and had "huge skills". Nevertheless, his spiritual powers were not counterbalanced with his magnificent mind and he had the hard luck to lead a people susceptible to demagoguery. K. Paparrigopoulos, a major modern Greek historian, underlines his "spiritual virtues" and compares him with Themistocles, but he then asserts that all these gifts created a "traitor, an audacious and impious man". Walter Ellis believes that his actions were outrageous, but they were performed with panache. For his part, David Gribble argues that Alcibiades's actions against his city were misunderstood and believes that "the tension which led to Alcibiades's split with the city was between purely personal and civic values". Russell Meiggs, a British ancient historian, asserts that the Athenian statesman was absolutely unscrupulous despite his great charm and brilliant abilities. According to Meiggs his actions were dictated by selfish motives and his feud with Cleon and his successors undermined Athens. The same scholar underscores the fact that "his example of restless and undisciplined ambition strengthened the charge brought against Socrates". Even more critically, Athanasios G. Platias and Constantinos Koliopoulos, professors of strategic studies and international politics, state that Alcibiades's own arguments "should be sufficient to do away with the notion that Alcibiades was a great statesman, as some people still believe".

=== Military achievements ===
Despite his critical comments, Thucydides admits in a short digression that "publicly his conduct of the war was as good as could be desired". Diodorus and Demosthenes regard him as a great general. According to Fotiadis, Alcibiades was an invincible general and, wherever he went, victory followed him; had he led the army in Sicily, the Athenians would have avoided disaster and, had his countrymen followed his advice at Aegospotami, Lysander would have lost and Athens would have ruled Greece. In contrast, Paparrigopoulos believes that the Sicilian Expedition, prompted by Alcibiades, was a strategic mistake. In agreement with Paparrigopoulos, Platias and Koliopoulos underscore the fact that the Sicilian expedition was a strategic blunder of the first magnitude, resulting from a "frivolous attitude and an unbelievable underestimation of the enemy". For his part, Angelos Vlachos, a Greek Academician, underlines the constant interest of Athens for Sicily from the beginning of the war. (Note: Since the beginning of the war, the Athenians had already initiated two expeditions and sent a delegation to Sicily. Plutarch underscores that "on Sicily the Athenians had cast longing eyes even while Pericles was living".) According to Vlachos, the expedition had nothing of the extravagant or adventurous and constituted a rational strategic decision based on traditional Athenian aspirations. Vlachos asserts that Alcibiades had already conceived a broader plan: the conquest of the whole West. He intended to conquer Carthage and Libya, then to attack Italy and, after winning these, to seize Italy and Peloponnesus. The initial decision of the ecclesia provided however for a reasonable military force, which later became unreasonably large and costly because of Nicias's demands. Kagan criticizes Alcibiades for failing to recognize that the large size of the Athenian expedition undermined the diplomatic scheme on which his strategy rested.

Kagan believes that while Alcibiades was a commander of considerable ability, he was no military genius, and his confidence and ambitions went far beyond his skills. He thus was capable of important errors and serious miscalculations. Kagan argues that at Notium, Alcibiades committed a serious error in leaving the fleet in the hands of an inexperienced officer, and that most of the credit for the brilliant victory at Cyzicus must be assigned to Thrasybulus. In this judgement, Kagan agrees with Cornelius Nepos, who said that the Athenians' extravagant opinion of Alcibiades's abilities and valor was his chief misfortune.

Press argues that "though Alcibiades can be considered a good general on the basis of his performance in the Hellespont, he would not be considered so on the basis of his performance in Sicily", but "the strengths of Alcibiades's performance as a general outweigh his faults".

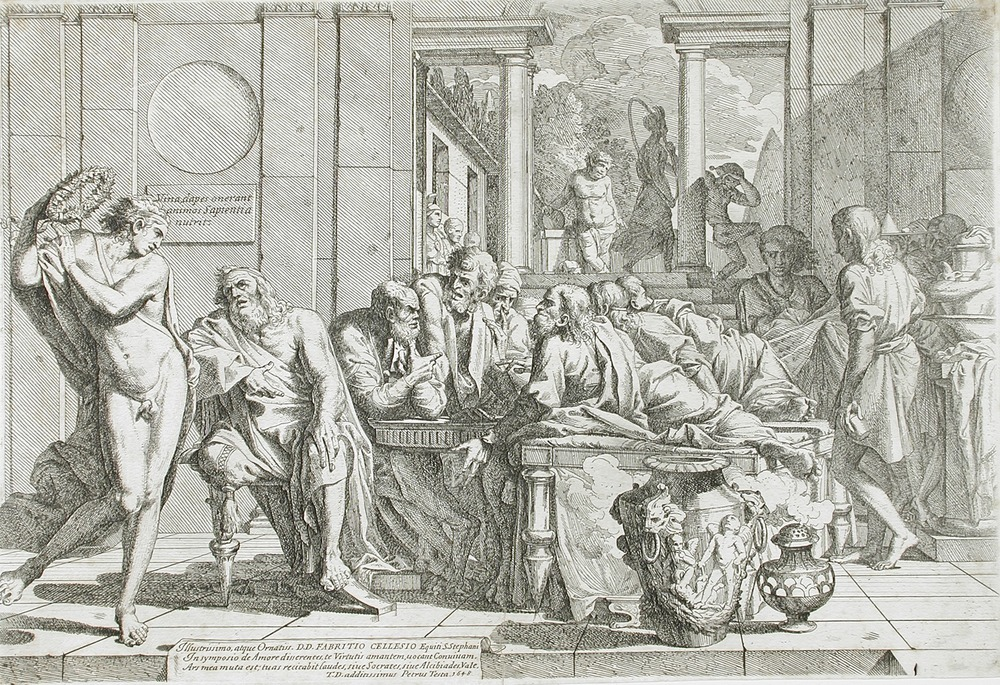
Pietro Testa: The Drunken Alcibiades Interrupting the Symposium (1648)

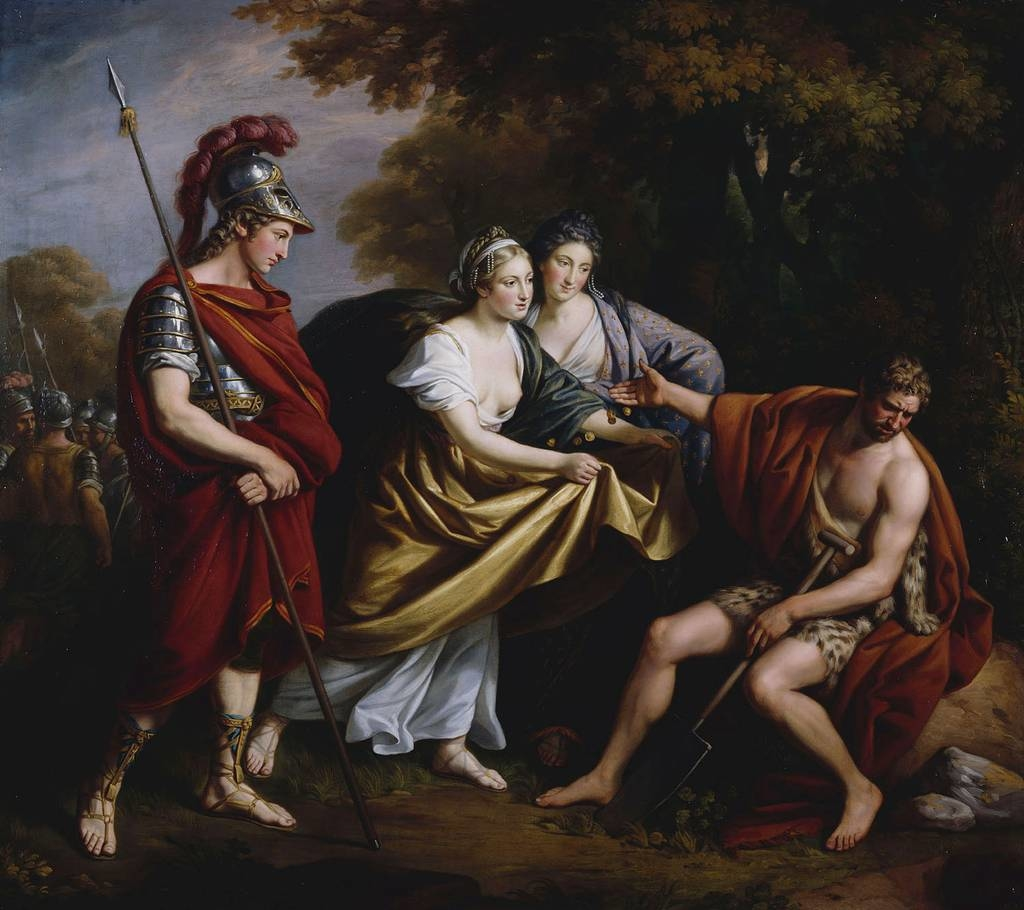
Nathaniel Dance-Holland: Timon of Athens (1766)

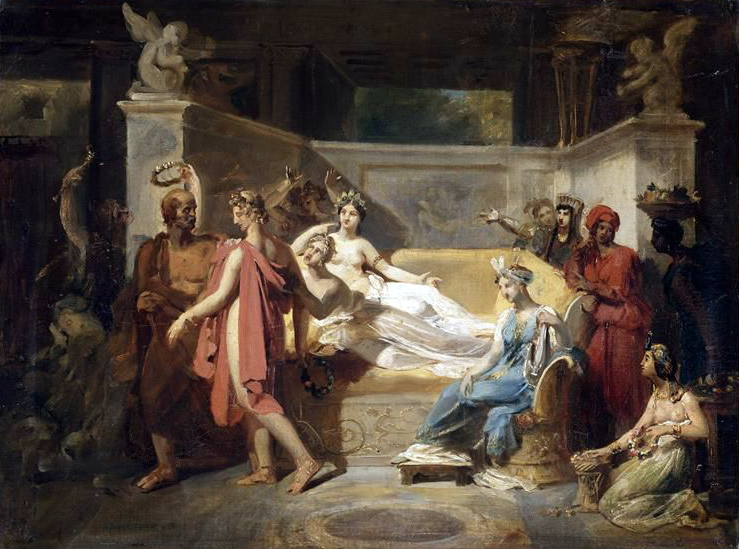
Félix Auvray (1800–1833): Alcibiades with the Courtesans (1833)

=== Skill in oratory ===
Plutarch asserts that "Alcibiades was a most able speaker in addition to his other gifts", while Theophrastus argues that Alcibiades was the most capable of discovering and understanding what was required in a given case. Nevertheless, he would often stumble in the midst of his speech, but then he would resume and proceed with all the caution in the world. Even the lisp he had, which was noticed by Aristophanes, made his talk persuasive and full of charm. Eupolis says that he was "prince of talkers, but in speaking most incapable"; which is to say, more eloquent in his private discourses than when orating before the ecclesia. For his part, Demosthenes underscores the fact that Alcibiades was regarded as "the ablest speaker of the day". Paparrigopoulos does not accept Demosthenes's opinion, but acknowledges that the Athenian statesman could sufficiently support his case. Kagan acknowledges his rhetorical power, whilst Thomas Habinek, professor of classics at the University of Southern California, believes that the orator Alcibiades seemed to be whatever his audience needed on any given occasion. According to Habinek, in the field of oratory, the people responded to Alcibiades's affection with affection of their own. Therefore, the orator was "the institution of the city talking to—and loving—itself". According to Aristophanes, Athens "yearns for him, and hates him too, but wants him back".

== References in popular culture ==
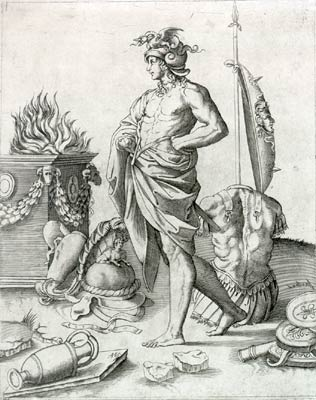
An engraving by Agostino Veneziano, reflecting a Renaissance view of Alcibiades

=== Antique depictions ===
Alcibiades has not been spared by ancient comedy, and stories attest to an epic confrontation between Alcibiades and Eupolis resembling that between Aristophanes and Cleon. He also appears as a character in several Socratic dialogues (Symposium, Protagoras, Alcibiades I and II, where he is depicted as a lover and student of Socrates, as well as the eponymous dialogues by Aeschines Socraticus and Antisthenes). Purportedly based on his own personal experience, Antisthenes described Alcibiades's extraordinary physical strength, courage, and beauty, saying, "If Achilles did not look like this, he was not really handsome." In his trial, Socrates rebuts the attempt to hold him guilty for the crimes of his former students, including Alcibiades. Hence, he declares in Apology: "I have never been anyone's teacher".

=== Postclassical depictions ===
Alcibiades has been depicted regularly in art, both in Medieval and Renaissance works, and in several significant works of modern literature as well. He is a major character in Shakespeare and Thomas Middleton's tragicomic play Timon of Athens, speaking no less than 7% of total lines and appearing in five scenes at the beginning, middle, and ending of the play. He has been the main character in historical novels of authors like Anna Bowman Dodd, Gertrude Atherton, Mary Renault, Rosemary Sutcliff, Daniel Chavarria, Steven Pressfield, Peter Green, and Ilja Leonard Pfeijffer.

=== Modern depictions ===
Alcibiades is also involved in the plot of the video game Assassin's Creed Odyssey, under the name Alkibiades.

Alcibiades's military prowess was cited by the eponymous character in Patton, within a scene in which Allied generals discuss possible plans for their forthcoming invasion of Sicily in 1943 during a lavish dinner hosted by U.S. Lieutenant general George S. Patton Jr.

== General references ==
=== Primary sources ===
- Andocides, Against Alcibiades. See original text in Perseus Project
- Aristophanes. The Frogs – via Wikisource.
- Aristophanes, Wasps. See original text in Perseus Project
- Aristotle. Athenian Constitution . Translated by Frederic George Kenyon – via Wikisource.
- Aristotle, History of Animals (translated in English by Wentworth Thompson)
- Aristotle. Posterior Analytics . Translated by Edmund Spenser Bouchier – via Wikisource.
  - Translation by G.R.G. Mure
- Cornelius Nepos: Life of Alcibiades, translated by J.C. Rolfe
- Demosthenes, Against Meidias. See original text in Perseus Project
- Diodorus Siculus, Library, 13th Book. See original text in Perseus Project.
- Isocrates, Busiris. See original text in Perseus Project
- Isocrates, Concerning the Team of Horses. See original text in Perseus Project
- Lysias (1898). "Alcibiades" . The Orations of Lysias. David McKay – via Wikisource.
- Lysias, Against Alcibiades 2. See original text in Perseus Project
- Plato, Alcibiades. See original text in Perseus Project. Translated in English by Sanderson Beck Archived 26 February 2023 at the Wayback Machine.
- Plato (1871). Apology . Translated by Benjamin Jowett – via Wikisource.
- Plato (1871). Symposium . Translated by Benjamin Jowett – via Wikisource.
- Plutarch (1683) [written in the late first century]. "Agesilaus" . Lives. Translated by John Dryden – via Wikisource.
  - Translated in English by John Dryden
- Plutarch (1683) [written in the late first century]. "Alcibiades" . Lives. Translated by John Dryden – via Wikisource.
  - Translated in English by Arthur H. Clough (New York: Collier Press, 1909), Aubrey Stewart-George Long and John Dryden.
- Plutarch (1683) [written in the late first century]. "Lysander" . Lives. Translated by John Dryden – via Wikisource.
- Plutarch (1683) [written in the late first century]. "Comparison of Alcibiades with Coriolanus" . Lives. Translated by John Dryden – via Wikisource.
  - Translated into English by Aubrey Stewart-George Long and John Dryden.
- Thucydides, History of the Peloponnesian War, V–VIII. See original text in Perseus Project.
- Xenophon (c. 1890s). Hellenica . Translated by Henry Graham Dakyns – via Wikisource.

=== Secondary sources ===
- "Alcibiades". Encyclopædia Britannica. 2005.
- "Alcibiades". Encyclopaedia of Ancient Greece. Routledge (UK). 2002. ISBN 978-0-415-97334-2.
- "Alcibiades". Encyclopaedic Dictionary The Helios. 1952. in Greek.
- Andrewes, A. (1992). "The Spartan Resurgence". The Cambridge Ancient History edited by David M. Lewis, John Boardman, J.K. Davies, M. Ostwald (Volume V). Cambridge University Press. ISBN 978-0-521-23347-7.
- Buck, R.J. (1998). Thrasybulus and the Athenian Democracy: the Life of an Athenian Statesman. Stuttgart: Franz Steiner Verlag. ISBN 978-3-515-07221-2.
- Buckley, Terry (1996). Aspects of Greek History 750–323 BC. Routledge (UK). ISBN 978-0-415-09957-8.
- Cartwright David, Warner Rex (1997). A Historical Commentary on Thucydides: A Companion to Rex Warner's Penguin Translation. University of Michigan Press. ISBN 978-0-472-08419-7.
- Cawkwell, George (1997). Thucydides and the Peloponnesian War. Routledge (UK). ISBN 978-0-415-16552-5.
- Corrigan, Elena (2004). "Alcibiades and the Conclusion of the Symposium". Plato's Dialectic at Play. Penn State Press. ISBN 978-0-271-02462-2.
- Cox, C.A. (1997). "What Was an Oikos?". Household Interests. Princeton University Press. ISBN 978-0-691-01572-9.
- Denyer, Nicolas (2001). Alcibiades (commentary). Cambridge University Press. ISBN 978-0-521-63414-4.
- Due, Bodil (1991). "The Return of Alcibiades in Xenophon's Hellenica". Classica et Mediaevalia – Revue Danoise de Philologie et d'Histoire. XLII: 39–54. ISBN 978-0-521-38867-2.
- Ellis, Walter M. (1989). Alcibiades. Routledge. ISBN 978-0-415-00994-2.
- Gomme, A.W.; A. Andrewes; K.J. Dover (1945–1981). An Historical Commentary on Thucydides (I–V). Oxford University Press. ISBN 978-0-19-814198-3.
- Gribble, David (1999). Alcibiades and Athens: A Study in Literary Presentation. Oxford University Press. ISBN 978-0-19-815267-5.
- Habinek, Thomas N. (2004). Ancient Rhetoric and Oratory. Blackwell Publishing. ISBN 978-0-631-23515-6.
- Hatzfeld, Jean (1951). Alcibiade (in French). Presses Universitaires de France.
- Kagan, Donald (1991). The Fall of the Athenian Empire. Cornell University Press. ISBN 978-0-8014-9984-5.
- Kagan, Donald (2003). The Peloponnesian War. Viking Penguin (Penguin Group). ISBN 978-0-670-03211-2.
- Kahn, C. (1994). "Aeschines on Socratic Eros". In Paul A. Vander Waerdt (ed.). The Socratic Movement. Cornell University Press. ISBN 978-0-8014-9903-6.
- Kelly, D. H. (2019). J. McDonald (ed.). 'Xenophon's Hellenika: a Commentary. Hakkert. ISBN 978-90-256-1344-0.
- Kern, Paul Bentley (1999). "Treatment of Captured Cities". Ancient Siege Warfare. Indiana University Press. ISBN 978-0-253-33546-3.
- Lee Too, Yun (1995). "The Politics of Discipleship". The Rhetoric of Identity in Isocrates. Cambridge University Press. ISBN 978-0-521-47406-1.
- Littman, Robert J. (1968). "The Strategy of the Battle of Cyzicus". Transactions and Proceedings of the American Philological Association. 99: 265–72. doi:10.2307/2935846. JSTOR 2935846.
- McCann David, Strauss Barry (2001). War and Democracy: A Comparative Study of the Korean War and the Peloponnesian War. M.E. Sharpe. ISBN 978-0-7656-0695-2.
- McGregor, Malcolm F. (1965). "The Genius of Alkibiades". Phoenix. 19 (1): 27–50. doi:10.2307/1086688. JSTOR 1086688. S2CID 164031367.
- Paparrigopoulos, Konstantinos (-Pavlos Karolidis) (1925), History of the Hellenic Nation (Volume Ab). Eleftheroudakis (in Greek).
- Peck, Harry Thurston (1898). Harper's Dictionary Of Classical Literature And Antiquities.
- Perrin, Bernadotte (1906). "The Death of Alcibiades". Transactions and Proceedings of the American Philological Association. 37: 25–37. doi:10.2307/282699. JSTOR 282699.
- Platias Athanasios G., Koliopoulos Constantinos (2006). Thucydides on Strategy. Eurasia Publications. ISBN 978-960-8187-16-0.
- Press, Sharon (1991). "Was Alcibiades a Good General?". Brown Classical Journal. 7. Archived from the original on 10 April 2010.
- Price, Simon (1999). "Religious Places". Religions of the Ancient Greeks. Cambridge University Press. ISBN 978-0-521-38867-2.
- Rhodes, P.J. (2005). A History of the Classical Greek World. Blackwell Publishing. ISBN 978-0-631-22564-5.
- Rhodes, P.J. (2011). Alcibiades: Athenian Playboy, General and Traitor. Pen and Sword Military Books. ISBN 978-1-84884-069-0.
- Sealey, Raphael (1976). "The Peloponnesian War". A History of the Greek City States, 700–338 BC. University of California Press. ISBN 978-0-520-03177-7.
- Scott, Gary Alan (2000). "Socrates and Teaching". Plato's Socrates as Educator. SUNY Press. ISBN 978-0-7914-4723-9.
- Smith, Willian (1851). A New Classical Dictionary of Greek and Roman Biography, Mythology and Geography. Harper & brothers.
- Smith, William (1870). Dictionary of Greek and Roman biography and mythology. London: James Walton.
- Strauss, Leo (1978). The City and Man. University of Chicago Press. ISBN 978-0-226-77701-6.
- Sykoutris, Ioannis (1934). Symposium (Introduction and Comments). Estia. in Greek.
- Vlachos, Angelos (1974). Thucydides' Bias. Estia (in Greek).
- Wolpert, Andrew (2002). Remembering Defeat: Civil War and Civic Memory in Ancient Athens. Johns Hopkins University Press. ISBN 978-0-8018-6790-3.
