= Tímea =

- Gender: feminine
- Language: Hungarian
- Name day: May 3

Origin
- Language: Greek
- Meaning: "honour," "sweet-natured," "good soul/mind/vitality," "cheerfulness," "good-spirits," "good mood."

Other names
- Nickname: Timi
- Derived: Euthymia

Tímea, Timea or originally, Timéa is a popular Hungarian female given name.

The name Tímea was created by the popular Hungarian author Mór Jókai for a figure in his 1872 novel The Man with the Golden Touch. It is derived from Euthymia, a Greek noun meaning "sweet natured".

In the novel, originally the name was presented as "Timéa" (pronounced: [ˈtimeːɒ]), but the name had spread in a somewhat altered form, Tímea ([ˈtiːmɛɒ]), as used today. There are conjectures that Jókai might have been influenced in his inventing (or re-introducing) the name by historical forerunners of the Antiquity. Alleged inspirations by the name of Timaea, Queen of Sparta, or by a female form of Timaeus are plausible both etymologically and historically (etymologically, a derivation from Latin "Timaea" to Hungarian "Timéa" would be straightforward, matching the Latin regional pronunciation of Hungary perfectly; and historically, Jókai, a man if his social class that time, had a good command of Latin language and wide knowledge about the culture of Antiquity), but the novel's story does not contain any direct clues, and there are no direct references in Jókai's other legacy documents either, except from the general fact that he often liked playing with language in many of his works and mentioning figures of the Antiquity in short remarks to ornate the style.

== People with the name ==
- Timaea, Queen of Sparta (fl. 5th century BC), wife of Agis II
- Tímea Babos (born 1993), Hungarian tennis player
- Timea Bacsinszky (born 1989), Swiss tennis player
- Tímea Gál (born 1984), Hungarian football player
- Timea Gardiner (born 2003), British-American basketball player
- Tímea Kiss (born 1973), Hungarian archer
- Tímea Lőrincz (born 1992), Romanian cross-country skier
- Timea Majorová (born 1974), Slovak fitness competitor
- Tímea Nagy (born 1970), Hungarian fencer
- Tímea Nagy (activist) (born 1977), Hungarian trafficked worker in Canada
- Tímea Paksy (born 1983), Hungarian sprint canoer
- Tímea Papp (born 1973), Hungarian dancer
- Tímea Sugár (born 1977), Hungarian handball coach
- Tímea Szabó (born 1976), Hungarian humanitarian worker, journalist and politician
- Tímea Szögi (born 1990), Hungarian handball player
- Timea Tătar (born 1989), Romanian handball player
- Tímea Tóth (born 1980), Hungarian former handballer
- Timea Toth (swimmer) (1968), Israeli Olympic swimmer
