= Želiezovce =

Želiezovce Zselíz
- Municipality
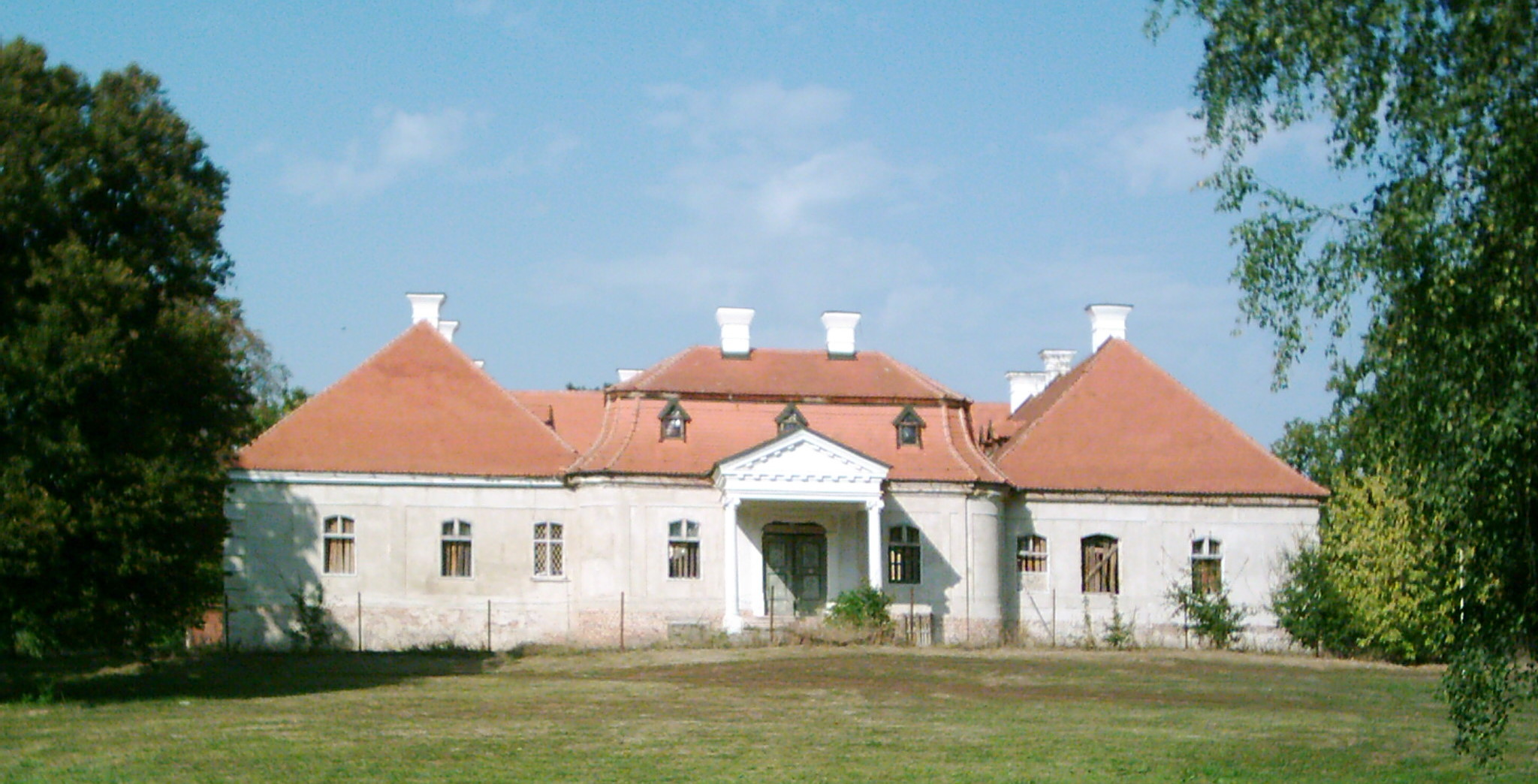

- Flag Coat of arms

- Location of Želiezovce in the Nitra Region Location of Želiezovce in Slovakia
- Coordinates: 48.05°N 18.66°E
- Country: Slovakia
- Region: Nitra Region
- District: Levice District
- First mentioned: 1274

Government
  - Mayor: András Juhász (Independent)

Area
  - Total: 56.52 km^{2} (21.82 sq mi)
- Elevation: 139 m (456 ft)

Population (2025)
  - Total: 6,519
- Time zone: UTC+1 (CET)
  - Summer (DST): UTC+2 (CEST)
- Postal code: 937 01
- Area code: +421 36
- Vehicle registration plate (until 2022): LV
- Website: www.zeliezovce.sk

Želiezovce (Hungarian: Zselíz, until 1895: Zseliz; German: Zelis) is a town in Slovakia in the Nitra Region in the Levice District, near the Hron river.

== Geography ==
The municipality lies at an altitude of 139 metres (456 ft) and covers an area of 56.52 km^{2} (21.82 sq mi) (2025).

== Districts ==
- Jarok (Hungarian: Nyitra-Ivánka)
- Karolína
- Mikula (1967 established) (Hungarian: Garam-Mikola)
- Rozina (Hungarian: Rozina major), named after Rozina Esterházy (Festetics) (1779 - 1854)
- Svodov (1976 established) (Hungarian: Szodó, Szódó, Yiddish: Sudov)
- Veľký Dvor (Hungarian: Kerek-Udvardi puszta)
- Želiezovce

== History ==
The territory of the settlement was inhabited as early as the Bronze Age, the Quadi period and the Great Moravian period. The town was first mentioned in 1274. Until 1918, the city belonged to the Kingdom of Hungary where it then became a part of Czechoslovakia until 1 January 1993 where it became a part of Slovakia when it split. It was heavily damaged at the end of World War II.

=== Archaeology ===
The town gave name to the archaeological Želiezovce group (named after a find in Veľký Pesek, now part of the village Sikenica, which was part of Želiezovce in 1986-1992).

=== Church of Saint James the Great ===
The most notable monument of Želiezovce is the medieval Church of Saint James the Great, situated in the town centre. It was built in its current form in the mid-fourteenth century, combining a polygonal apse with a single nave. The building has been richly decorated with at least four different layers of wall painting, which survive from the late fourteenth and early fifteenth centuries. The church contains a fresco from the 1380s in the apse, which depicts a celestial trial for the departing soul of the local landlord and knight George Becsei. Other surviving murals include a Man of Sorrows on the south-eastern wall of the apse, St Catherine in a sedilia in the nave, and SS Martin and Leonard of Noblac further down on the south wall of the nave.

== Population ==
Population statistic (10 years)
Year	1995	2005	2015	2025
Count	7628	7486	6984	6519
Difference		−1.86%	−6.70%	−6.65%

Population statistic
Year	2024	2025
Count	6558	6519
Difference		−0.59%

It has a population of 6519 people (31 December 2025).

According to the 2001 census, the town had 7,522 inhabitants. 51.25% of inhabitants were Hungarians, 47.10% Slovaks, 0.55% Roma and 0.49% Czechs. The religious make-up was 61.27% Roman Catholics, 18.43% people with no religious affiliation, and 6.37% Lutherans.

=== Ethnicity ===
Census 2021 (1+%)
Ethnicity	Number	Fraction
Slovak	3519	52.08%
Hungarian	2993	44.3%
Not found out	551	8.15%
Total	6756	

In year 2021 was 6756 people by ethnicity 3519 as Slovak, 2993 as Hungarian, 551 as Not found out, 33 as Czech, 16 as Romani, 6 as Chinese, 6 as Other, 5 as Ukrainian, 5 as Rusyn, 5 as Russian, 4 as Bulgarian, 3 as Vietnamese, 3 as Polish, 2 as German, 1 as Italian, 1 as Moravian and 1 as French.

Note on population: The difference values of population numbers in the table "Population statistic" and in the sections "Ethnicity" & "Religion" is caused by the use of various statistical methods.

=== Religion ===
Census 2021 (1+%)
Religion	Number	Fraction
Roman Catholic Church	3012	44.58%
None	2151	31.84%
Calvinist Church	630	9.33%
Not found out	514	7.61%
Evangelical Church	256	3.79%
Total	6756	

In year 2021 was 6756 people by religion 3012 from Roman Catholic Church, 2151 from None, 630 from Calvinist Church, 514 from Not found out, 256 from Evangelical Church, 62 from Greek Catholic Church, 30 from Jehovah's Witnesses, 19 from Other, 17 from Christian Congregations in Slovakia, 13 from Ad hoc movements, 10 from Other and not ascertained christian church, 10 from United Methodist Church, 7 from Buddhism, 5 from Old Catholic Church, 5 from Eastern Orthodox Church, 3 from Islam, 3 from Seventh-day Adventist Church, 2 from Church of the Brethren, 2 from Baptists Church, 1 from Jewish community, 1 from Paganism and natural spirituality, 1 from Hinduism, 1 from Church of Jesus Christ of Latter-day Saints and 1 from Bahá'i Community.

== Features ==
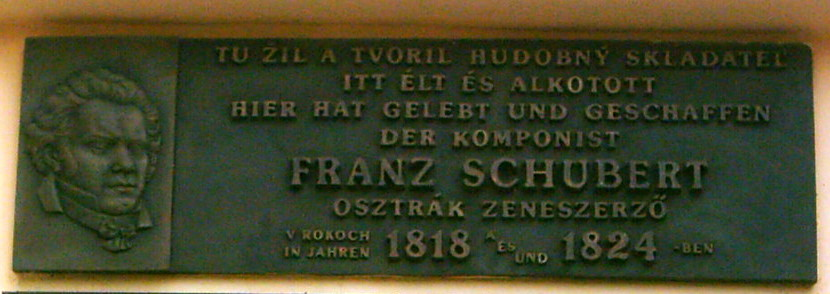
The Schubert House or Owl Chateau

The town is known for a former Neoclassical residence of Count Johann Karl Esterházy, where the Austrian composer Franz Schubert taught music to the Count's daughters Maria and Karoline in the summers of 1818 and 1824. Apart from a nice large park, there is another important building: the Schubert House or Owl Chateau (Slovak: Soví zámoček, Magyar: Baglyosház), where Franz Schubert stayed, and composed some of his works. Finally, the town features a Gothic Catholic church, severely damaged in 1945.

== Notable people ==
- Franz Schubert (1797–1828), Austrian composer; wrote his Grand Duo, Marche militaire and Ungarische Melodie D 817 here
- Attila Mokos (born 1964), actor
- Timea Majorová (born 1974), bodybuilder; lived here

== Twin towns — sister cities ==
Želiezovce is twinned with:

- Miercurea Ciuc, Romania
- Makó, Hungary
- Barcs, Hungary
- Trstená, Slovakia

== See also ==
- Franz Schubert City Museum in Želiezovce
