= Antiochus (admiral) =

Athenian naval general (died 406 BC)

Antiochus (Ancient Greek: Ἀντίοχος) of Athens was a commander of ancient Greece during the Peloponnesian War who was left by the Athenian commander Alcibiades at Notium in command of the Athenian fleet in 407 BCE, with strict injunctions not to engage the Spartan commander Lysander.

Antiochus was the master of Alcibiades' own ship, and his personal friend; he was a skilful seaman, but arrogant and heedless of consequences. His intimacy with Alcibiades had first arisen upon an occasion mentioned by the writer Plutarch, who tells us that Alcibiades in one of his first appearances in the popular assembly allowed a tame quail to escape from under his cloak, which occurrence suspended the business of the assembly, till it was caught by Antiochus and given to Alcibiades.

Antiochus gave no heed to the injunctions of Alcibiades, and provoked Lysander to an engagement in what came to be known as the Battle of Notium, in which fifteen Athenian ships were lost, and Antiochus himself was killed. This defeat was a small but symbolic victory for the Spartans, and one of the main causes that led to the second banishment of Alcibiades. It firmly established Lysander as a commander who was capable of defeating the Athenians at sea.
