= Vácrátót =

Coordinates: 47°42′39″N 19°14′07″E

- Village
- Country: Hungary
- Region: Central Hungary
- County: Pest
- Website: vacratot.hu

Vácrátót is a village in Pest County in Hungary.

== History ==
The village of Vácrátót, since its first mention, has belonged to Pest-Pilis-Solt, and the Vác district of Pest County. During the archaeological explorations here, some prehistoric earthenware and chipped flint implements representing the culture of Zselíz were found, as well as crock from the Bronze and Iron Ages, which suggested an already permanently settled population. The area was also populated in the Roman Age – as proven by the large number of Sarmatian relics – but records of the age of the Hungarian Settlement and the early Arpadian Age were also found in the fields around the village.

The medieval village was built in the North-Western part of today's settlement, at a distance of about four-hundred meters from the centre of the settlement.

It received its name – in line with the habits of the time – after its first owner. According to Simon Kézai's Illustrated Chronicle, Olivér and Ratold knights, from the Italian province of Apulia, came to the country at the end of the 11th century where they received several estates. One of them was the village of Rátót in Pest county together with the territory of the neighbouring villages. The members of the family shared their property in 1283, and the village of Ratold – today's Rátót – was given to the sons of Leusták and Olivér, as well as the sons of István, Domokos (ancestor of the Pásztói family), and László (ancestor of the Tari family). The village must have been a significant settlement, it also had a church.

We can already find several written sources about the history of the settlement in the 13th - 14th centuries. The two largest landowners were the Pásztói and the Tari families, but the Nézsaies also owned some parts of the land. They sold and purchased their estates, and waged a constant fight for the watermills placed on the stream with its abundantly waters. The road cutting through the village connected the Great Hungarian Plain, and thus the salt-mines in Transylvania beyond, with the part of Transdanubia with the help the ferry at Vác. There were not only peaceful merchants and carriers using this main road, but troops marched on it in almost every century. The nearby Vác ensured a safe market for the people of Rátót, who earned their living from agriculture. From time to time, however, they also shared the sad destiny of their bigger neighbour.

After 1541, Rátót became an area under Turkish rule, and its inhabitants had to pay double taxes: both to the Turks and the Hungarians. During the almost two centuries of the Turkish rule, the name of the settlement always appeared in the Turkish and Hungarian tax registers, which means that it was a continuously inhabited place.

It, however, could not survive the devastation of the liberating fights against the Turks. In 1690, it was registered as an uninhabited place. Later, we could again meet the people of Rátót and their landowners. The two largest land-owning families in the 18th century were the Mágóchy and the Róth. The number of its population kept growing on a continuous basis, and reached five-hundred by the turn of the century. Scientific research has not yet confirmed the hypothesis according to which the earlier original Hungarian population remained in a relatively large number in Rátót. But the place was mostly inhabited by Hungarians, while the adjacent villages were dominated by the Slovaks. Due to the mixing by way of marriages, Rátót also started to be dominated by the Slovaks, although the majority of the population considered themselves as Hungarians, but lived and spoke in a Slovak way. This unique ethnic duality of the people of Vácrátót could be seen in their way of clothing, habits and the use of the language until the recent decades.

The population of Rátót is characteristically catholic, and they have preserved their faith until today. The church built by landowner János Mágóchy in 1746 was enlarged several times during the centuries. Its altars and main internal objects belong to the highest level Hungarian baroque wood sculpture.

The serfs of Rátót village got rid of their socage in 1848. By this time, the cotter's system, and tiny pieces of the earlier fee estates became characteristic. After the abolishment of serfdom, only the pasture fields remained in common use, and the earlier seigniorial vineyard was also distributed. The farmers mostly produced rye, barley and maize in the sandy soil in the generally used three-course rotation. In 1895, more than half of the farms were arable land, while the proportion of meadow and pasture was close to one third of the whole area, which made it possible to spread the profitable cattle breeding on the pastures fed with abundant waters. At the turn of the century, eighty-seven percent of the total population lived directly from agriculture.

Count Sándor Vigyázó bought the lands belonging to Rátót in 1873, and created a model farm here. Farming on this large estate was profitable, and made it possible to create and permanently smarten an ornamental garden on 28 hectares here.

Next to the large estate and the manor-house, the lands of the farmers of Vácrátót further continued to break up into smaller plots: in 1941, only seventy-five percent of its total population could earn a living from agriculture, fifteen percent of them found jobs outside the village – mainly in the industrial plants of Vác and Újpest.

The land structure did not change significantly even after the distribution of the large estate, and the Communist transformation of the country after the war. The imposed economic policy of the fifties, with its limitations put on private farming, actually, forced the population to escape from the village. The social structure of Vácrátót has basically changed over the last fifty years. The two- or more-breadwinner type family model has been created, in which one member of the family works on the farm at home, while the others – mostly the men and the youngsters – have to take on living a double life: they commute to work.

The society of the village again find themselves in a difficult position due to the changes of the system. The lives of the workers in Vácrátót have become insecure with the transformation and closing down of industrial plants, most of them have become unemployed. Due to their relatively low level of education, they have very little chances to find jobs.

== Botanical Garden ==
The botanical garden of Vácrátót is of international fame. It receives 100,000 visitors each year in the earlier Vigyázó manor-house and its park.

This is the only place in the country to have a phyto-taxonomic collection, alongside exotic plants in the green-house and the rockery. It has an extensive collection of trees and shrubs, as well as a garden to present some Biblical plants.

== Vigyázó Castle ==
There was a castle here owned by the Vigyázó family. It has been destroyed in the 1940s. Only the manor house may be found today. It was built by the Debreczeny family.
