= Spacerider =

Spacerider, Space-Riders, or variation, may refer to:

- Space RIDER (Space Reusable Integrated Demonstrator for Europe Return), ESA uncrewed orbital spaceplane project
- Space Riders (1984 film) British sports drama film
- Space Riders: Division Earth, a web series starring Canadian comedian Mark Little
- Spacerider, a dance troupe founded by Tímea Papp
- Spacerider: Love at First Sight, album by electronica band Chandeen, 1998
- Spacerider, a single by Chandeen, 1998

== See also ==
- Space (disambiguation)
- Rider (disambiguation)
