= Mantitheos =

- Native name: Μαντιθέος
- Allegiance: Athens
- Rank: Commander
- Commands: Hellespont (with Diodoros)
- Conflicts: Peloponnesian War
- Other work: Envoy to Persia (408 BC)

Mantitheos (Gr. Μαντιθέος) was an Athenian military commander in Asia Minor during the Peloponnesian War and also served as an envoy to ancient Persia in 408 BC.

Xenophon says that Mantitheos had been captured in Caria and links his escape from Tissaphernes to that of the charismatic Athenian leader, Alkibiades in 411 BC. Mantitheos and Diodoros were left in charge in the Hellespont by Alkibiades after the capture of Byzantion. Xenophon is almost certainly referring to the same Mantitheos, when he appears serving alongside four other Athenians (Dorotheos, Philokydes, Theogenes and Euryptolemos) and two Argives (Kleostratos and Pyrrolokhos) as envoys to Persia in 408 BC, seeking Persian support in the war against Sparta. Their efforts were unsuccessful. It is possible that this Mantitheos is the member of the Athenian boule (council), who fled Athens during the mutilation of the hermae on the eve of the disastrous Sicilian expedition.

Nothing further is known about him.
