= Hipparete =

Spouse of Alcibiades

Hipparete (Greek: Ἱππαρέτη) was the daughter of Hipponicus III, a wealthy Athenian. She was married c. 424 BC or earlier to the prominent Athenian statesman and general Alcibiades.

== Life ==
According to Plutarch, who is however criticized for using "implausible or unreliable stories" in order to construct Alcibiades' portrait, Alcibiades "gave a box on the ear to Hipponicus, whose birth and wealth made him a person of great influence." This action received much disapproval, since it was "unprovoked by any passion of quarrel between them". To smooth the incident over, Alcibiades went to Hipponicus's house and, after stripping naked, "desired him to scourge and chastise him as he pleased". Hipponicus not only pardoned him but also bestowed upon him the hand of his daughter.

Another version of the story- again by Plutarch's word- is that it was not Hipponicus, but Callias III, his son, who gave Hipparete to Alcibiades, with a dowry of ten talents. Then, "when she became a mother, Alcibiades exacted another ten talents besides, on the plea that this was the agreement, should children be born. And Callias was so afraid of the scheming of Alcibiades to get his wealth, that he made public proffer to the people of his property and house in case it should befall him to die without lineal heirs."

According to Plutarch, Hipparete loved her husband, but she once attempted to divorce him, because Alcibiades consorted with courtesans. It was then that upon her public appearance to support her plea for divorce from the magistrate, "Alcibiades came up and seized her and carried her off home with him through the market place, no man daring to oppose him or take her from him". She continued to live with him, but died shortly afterwards, while he was in Ephesus.
