= Hipponicus III =

5th-century BC Athenian military commander

- Ἱππόνικος
- Born: c. 485 BC
- Died: 422/1 BC (aged c. 63)
- Children: Callias III, Hipparete and Hermogenes
- Military career
- Allegiance: Athens

Hipponicus III (/hɪˈpɒnɪkəs/; Greek: Ἱππόνικος; c. 485 BC – 422/1 BC) was an Athenian military commander. He was the son of Callias II of the deme Alopece and Elpinice of Laciadae (sister of Cimon). He was known as the "richest man in Greece".

Shortly after 455 BC, Hipponicus married the former wife of Pericles, whose name is unknown. By her, he had two children: Callias III and a daughter, Hipparete who later married Alcibiades. A second son, Hermogenes was probably illegitimate since he received none of his father's estate.

Hipponicus' wealth came from, among other things, his owning six hundred slaves working at the silver mines at Laurion in southern Attica.

In 445/4 BC he was secretary of the Athenian Council (boule) and was still active as late as 426 BC when he, Nicias and Eurymedon commanded Athenian regiments in an incursion into Boeotian territory where they successfully engaged Tanagran and Theban forces at Tanagra.

Hipponicus was reported by Andocides to have been slain at the Battle of Delium in 424 BC, but this appears to have been an error, either on Andocides' part or a later transcriber, for Thucydides reported that the general at Delium was Hippocrates. According to Athenaeus, Hipponicus died shortly before Eupolis exhibited his comedy Flatterers during the archonship of Alcaeus ( 422/1).

Aelian, in his Varieties of History, reports this anecdote about Hipponicus:

Hipponicus son of Callias would erect a Statue as a Gift to his Country. One advised him that the Statue should be made by Polycletus. He answered, "I will not have such a Statue, the glory whereof will redound not to the Giver, but to the Carver. For it is certain that all who see the Art, will admire Polycletus and not me."
