= Želiezovce group =

The Želiezovce group was an archaeological group ("culture") during the first part of the Middle Neolithic period in western Slovakia, Spiš, Transdanubia, adjacent Austria, southern Moravia, and southern and south-eastern Poland. It arose from the Linear Pottery Culture.

The group is named after finds made in Veľký Pesek, now part of the village of Sikenica (which was part of Želiezovce in 1986-1992). The excavation archive was deposited in Želiezovce when discovered.
