= Félix Auvray =

French painter (1800–1833)

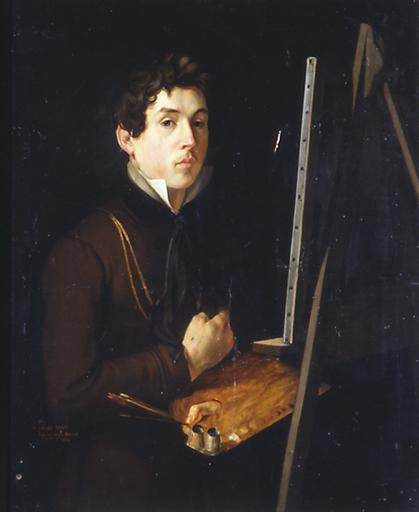
Self-portrait, ca. 1819, Musée des beaux-arts of Valenciennes

Joseph Félix Henri Auvray (1800–1833) was a French historical painter.

== Life and career ==
Auvray was born at Cambrai in 1800. He was a pupil of Momal in Valenciennes, and afterwards of Antoine-Jean Gros in Paris. In 1824 he exhibited St. Louis a Prisoner, and in 1827, Gautier de Châtillon defending St. Louis against the Saracens, now in the Musée des Beaux-Arts de Cambrai, and St. Paul at Athens. He died at Cambrai in 1833.
