= Classica et Mediaevalia =

- Discipline: Philology, history
- Language: English, French, German
- Edited by: George Hinge

Publication details
- Former name(s): Classica et Mediaevalia, Revue danoise de philologie et d'histoire
- History: 1938-present
- Frequency: Annually

Standard abbreviations
- ISO 4: Class. Mediaev.

Indexing
- ISSN: 0106-5815 (print); 1604-9411 (web)
- OCLC no.: 1770718

Links
- Journal homepage

Classica et Mediaevalia, Danish Journal of Philology and History is a peer-reviewed open access academic journal of philology and history published annually by Museum Tusculanum Press. It is based at Aarhus University and was established in 1938 as Classica et Mediaevalia, Revue danoise de philologie et d'histoire, at which time it was warmly received by reviewers. It publishes articles in English, French, and German and is included in a number of bibliographic databases.

The editor-in-chief is George Hinge (Aarhus University). The journal publishes contributions relating to the Greek and Latin languages as well as to Greek and Latin literature up to and including the late Middle Ages. It also publishes contributions in the fields of Graeco-Roman history, the classical influence in general history, legal history, the history of philosophy, and ecclesiastical history. Publication of the supplementary series Classica et Mediaevalia dissertationes has ceased.

Classica et Mediaevalia is ranked "Int1" (history) and "Int2" (classical studies) by the European Reference Index for the Humanities.
