= Timaea, Queen of Sparta =

Wife of Agis II of Sparta

Timaea (d. after 401 BC), was a Spartan queen, married to king Agis II of Sparta.

She is known for her alleged love affair with Alcibiades, with whom she had her son Leotychides of Sparta, whose paternity she made no attempt to hide, which was reportedly the reason as to why Leotychidas was not allowed to succeed Agis II but replaced by his uncle Agesilaus II.

Issue

- Leotychides of Sparta
