= Timea Majorová =

Slovak fitness & figure competitor

Timea Majorova
- professional bodybuilder

Personal info
- Born: October 2, 1974 (age 50); Bratislava, Czechoslovakia

Best statistics
- Height: 5 ft 8 in (173 cm)
- Weight: 135 lb off season; 132 lb contest

Professional (Pro) career
- Pro-debut: Amateur World Championships; 1997
- Best win: 2001 Hungarian Pro Fitness Champion
- Active: Retired 2001

Timea Majorova (born October 2, 1974 in Bratislava, Czechoslovakia) is an IFBB professional fitness competitor.

== Biography ==
=== Early life ===
Majorova was born to a Hungarian father and a Slovak mother in 1974 in Bratislava, Czechoslovakia. She has a fraternal twin, František. Her father is a teacher while her mother is a nurse. Timea thanks her brothers and her father as major influences in her life for her athleticism. She "was always doing man's activities because of her two brothers." She calls herself a 'tomboy'. (Timea Majorova DVD). Besides being athletic, Timea is able to speak three languages fluently in addition to English: Hungarian, Russian and Slovak.

She began her studies in a Hungarian elementary school, and when she was 14 she moved to a medical school in Bratislava where she earned a degree in physical therapy.

=== Fitness career ===
Timea Majorova became involved in sport and fitness competitions at a very young age and she also tried herself in the fashion and beauty world, having won a beauty contest. Her first fitness contest was the Ms. Slovakia Fitness Championships of 1994, where she placed 2nd. On February 14, 1997 Timea got her United States Visa. She then moved to Los Angeles in order to further pursue her fitness career, where she represented Slovakia in the European championships. She would finally win a championship in 1997, where she placed 1st in the Amateur World Championships. The 1997 win made her an IFBB Fitness Pro. Her first Fitness Olympia was in 1998, where she placed 6th. It was during the 1999 Fitness Olympia where Timea met Joe and Betsy Weider, which she considers a very important motivational figure in her life. In 1999 Timea won 5th place in the Arnold Classic. In total, she has taken part in more than twenty competitions.

== Personal life ==
In 2000 Timea went back to Želiezovce to marry her partner Jozef Drsman. Jozef was Timea's personal trainer and trained Timea in the past for competition. Later they owned and operated Pro Gym in Los Angeles/Branford. The couple later divorced.

She is currently living in Santa Monica, California where she is also pursuing a career in acting.

== Stats ==
- Height: 5'8"
- Weight: 135 pounds off season; 132 pounds contest
- Measurements: 36-24-36

== Competition history ==
- 1995 Ms Slovakia Fitness 1st
- 1997 European Amateur Fitness Championships 1st
- 1997 World Amateur Fitness Championships 1st
- 1997 Fitness Ms. Olympia 11th
- 1998 Jan Tana Pro Fitness 14th
- 1998 Fitness International 11th
- 1998 Fitness Ms. Olympia 6th
- 1998 French Pro Fitness Classic 4th
- 1998 Czech. Republic Pro Fitness 3rd
- 1999 Fitness Ms. Olympia 5th
- 1999 Fitness International 4th
- 1999 Finland Pro Fitness Classic 3rd
- 1999 Denmark Pro Fitness Classic 2nd
- 2000 Fitness International 2nd
- 2000 Atlantic City Pro Fitness 1st
- 2000 Fitness Olympia 4th
- 2001 Fitness International 5th
- 2001 Fitness Ms. Olympia 5th
- 2001 Hungarian Pro Fitness 1st

== Notes ==
- Timea Majorova: World Fitness Champion & International Fitness Model. Timea Majorova Bio. Accessed 11-2-2006.
- The Fit Show Presents: "Timea Majorova: Living the American Dream" DVD. Viewed July 21, 2007.
