= Tímea Papp =

Hungarian dancer and choreographer

- Born: Tímea Papp; Kaposvár, Hungary
- Education: Hungarian Dance Academy, Codarts, Netherlands
- Occupations: dancer; choreographer; actress; dance teacher
- Years active: 1996–present
- Labels: Freelusion; RTL Klub
- Website: www.timeapapp.com

Tímea Papp (born in Kaposvár) is a Hungarian dancer and choreographer who can be recognized for her work in the Hungarian Film and Television Industry. Apart from graduating from both the Rotterdam Dance Academy and the Hungarian Dance Academy she participated in dance courses all around the world. Thanks to her knowledge and experience in many genres of dance from ballet through broadway and jazz all the way to contemporary dance she contributed to the success of award-winning feature films, theatrical productions like Chicago (musical), television shows such as Britain's Got Talent, America's Got Talent, Eurovision (Moscow, 2009 and Düsseldorf, 2011) and Fake Off in addition to advertisements and other creative projects worldwide. Since 2004 she has been working on developing a special technique where she combines dancing with videomapping projections to create an interactive choreography supplemented by visual elements. From 2009 using videomapping technique has been a kind of "trademark" in her work. She is currently the artistic director and choreographer of the dance team called Freelusion.

== Early life ==
Tímea Papp was born in Kaposvár, Hungary. She was raised in a family with three children, she has an older and a younger brother. Both her brothers grew up to be entrepreneurs; her younger brother became the co-founder of Freelusion. Her dad was a drummer who gave up being a professional musician for his family. Nevertheless, he never gave up creating rhythm with any object he could find around himself. Tímea's mother was an amateur dancer and a huge dance enthusiast her whole life. Tímea was infected with rhythm, music, and dancing from a very early age thanks to her parents. This impact was so great that she moved to Pécs in her teenage years so she could start her professional dancing training in the High School of Arts.

== Field of Scientific Research, Mission ==
As mentioned earlier, Tímea Papp growing up has been surrounded by inspiration which drew her towards dancing. Learning Latin dances and ballet in her childhood, she was fascinated by street dances in the early 80's. Beside the dancing she spent 4 years studying kung fu. Her body awareness in space became very important to her. Rudolf von Laban movement theoretic's space harmony theory has been a great influence on her work. All her research in movement, space and body awareness and her education and experience as a dancer lead to creating her own project: "Spacerider", which can be interpreted as her own avatar in her high-tech interactive choreographies.

== Education and training ==
- 1988-1992 High School of Arts, Pecs
- 1993-1996 Rotterdam Dance Academy Codarts Faculty of Dance Teacher majoring in Jazz and Modern dance
- 1992-2003 Courses: Budapest, Rotterdam, Amsterdam, London, Pecs, Tokyo, New York
- 1998-2001 Hungarian Dance Academy, Budapest Faculty of Choreographer

== Work experience as a dance teacher ==
- High School of Arts, Pecs Modern dance teacher
- Faculty of Sciences, University of Pecs Jazz-and Modern dance teacher
- Budapest Contemporary Dance School Jazz-and Modern dance teacher
- Talentum Contemporary Dance School, Budapest
- Hungarian Dance Academy, Budapest Teacher of Jazz-and Modern dance
- Elmhurst School for Dancing and Performing Arts, England Modern dance teacher
- University of Theatre and Film Arts, Jazz dance teacher
- Budapest Contemporary Dance Academy- Jazz-and Modern dance teacher
- Hungarian Dance Academy, Budapest - Teacher of Jazz-and Modern dance, training methods, Arts of choreography, Leading teacher of street-urban dance major

== Choreographer ==
- Competition for Inspirational Choreographers Budapest: ’Na, most ki kivel van? (Now, who is with whom?)’ Pecs Ballet: ’Idegenek (Strangers)’
- Pecs Ballet: ’Párkeresés (Looking for a partner)’ Utolsó Csepp Festival (Last Drop Festival): ’Hattyúdal (Swan-song)’ Attila Jozsef Theatre: ’Villon és a többiek (Villon and the others)’
- Pecs Ballet: ’Függő viszonyok (Dependence)’ Trafo: ’Trio’ University of Drama, Film and Television: ’Chicago’ musical Utolsó Csepp Festival (Last Drop Festival): ’Hitchcock’
- Madach Theatre: ’Chicago’ musical
- Hungarian Dance Academy Solo creations for international ballet competitions
- RTL Klub, Aranycsirke Awards Gala
- ’Egy szoknya, egy nadrág’ Hungarian feature film
- Choreographer and director of events and commercials
- Madach Theater: ’They are playing our song’ musical
- Madach Theatre: ’Te édes, de jó vagy, légy más! (I love you, you’re perfect, now change!)’ musical
- 3 seasons of ’Dancing with the stars’ RTL television
- ’Mahagonny’ opera Thalia Theater
- ’A kind of America 2’ Hungarian feature film
- Eurovision Moscow (Zoltan Ádok: ’Dance with me’)
- Sziget Festival Flashmob
- 3 seasons of ’Hungary’s got talent’ RTL television
- Choreographer of X Factor RTL television
- Eurovision Düsseldorf (Kati Wolf: What about my dreams)
- Car Shows (Fiat, VW) Shanghai, Beijing, Delhi
- Ramy Ayach Music video in Beirut
- Britain's Got Talent contestant FREELUSION (semi final)
- America's Got Talent contestant SENSETION (semi final)
- Fake Off TruTV America contestant FREELUSION USA (final)
- Norwegian Dancing with the stars Commercial Skal we Danse
- IPTL tennis tour cheerleaders (Singapore-Manila-Delhi-Dubai)
- Swing Hungarian feature film
- American Girl Disney production

== Dancer / performer ==
- Madach Theatre: ’Chicago’ musical (Mona)
- RTL Klub, ’Első Generáció (First Generation)’ – TV series (Alina)
- Performances and video clips in Miami and Tokyo
- National Dance Theatre: ’1W’, solo
- Budapest Operetta Theatre: ’Púder (face-powder)’ choreographer: Eva Duda
- Music videos
- ’Dancing with the stars’ Hungary
- ’Kind of America 2’
- Eurovision Moscow (Zoltan Ádok: ’Dance with me’)
- Spacerider project
- Freelusion Dance Company
- Touring with Spacerider and Freelusion (Shanghai, Delhi, Istanbul)
- Britain’s Got Talent contestant FREELUSION (semi final)
- Fake Off TruTV America contestant FREELUSION USA (final)
- IPTL tennis tour cheerleaders (Singapore-Manila-Delhi-Dubai)

== Awards ==
- 1999: Fülöp Viktor Scholarship
- 2005: Award of Excellence in the field of Dance Pedagogy
