= Sikenica =

Sikenica Peszektergenye
- Municipality
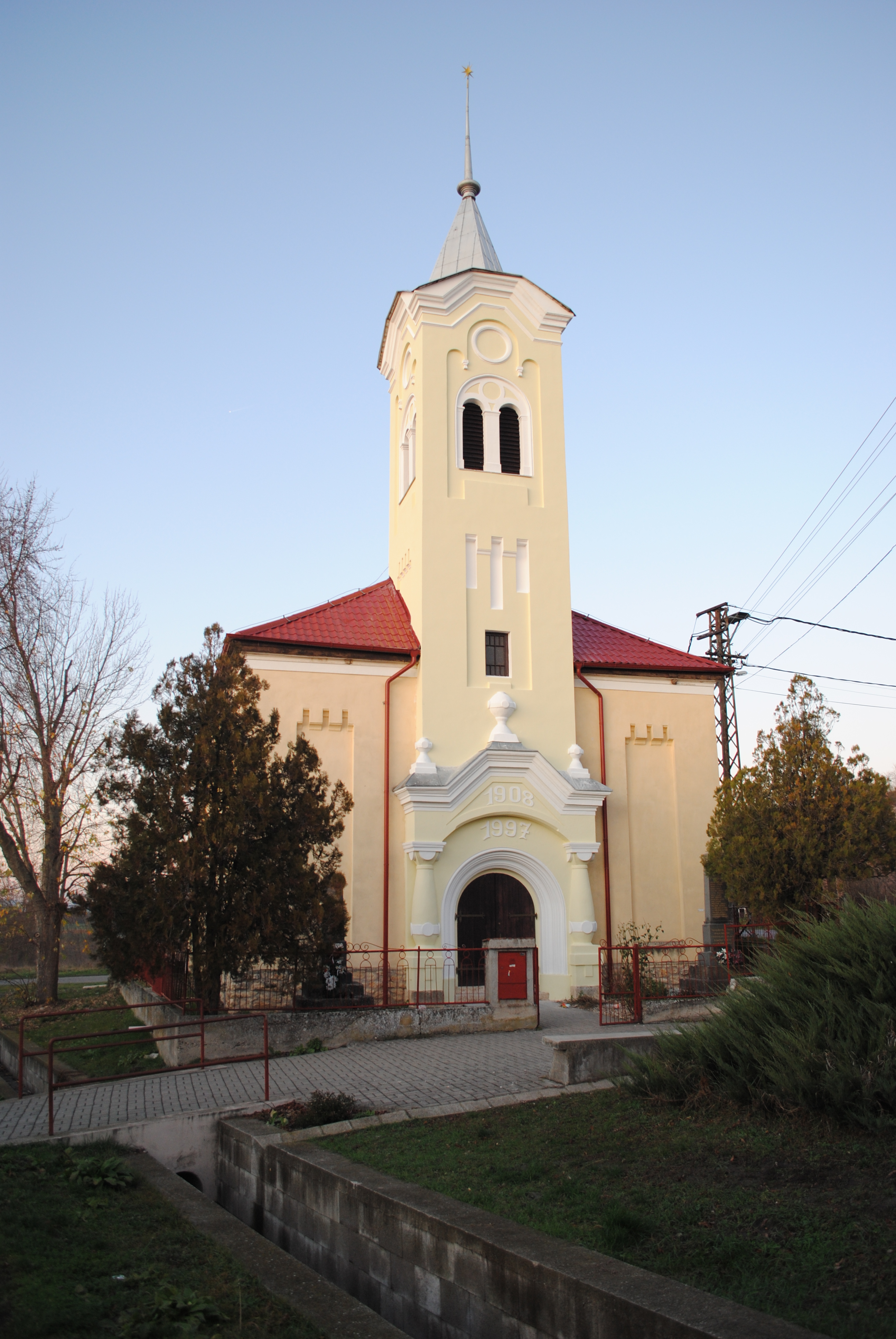
- Reformed Church in Sikenica

- Flag

- Location of Sikenica in the Nitra Region Location of Sikenica in Slovakia
- Coordinates: 48.08°N 18.72°E
- Country: Slovakia
- Region: Nitra Region
- District: Levice District
- First mentioned: 1307

Area
  - Total: 25.54 km^{2} (9.86 sq mi)
- Elevation: 136 m (446 ft)

Population (2025)
  - Total: 589
- Time zone: UTC+1 (CET)
  - Summer (DST): UTC+2 (CEST)
- Postal code: 937 01
- Area code: +421 36
- Vehicle registration plate (until 2022): LV
- Website: www.sikenica.sk

Sikenica (Hungarian: Peszektergenye) is a village and municipality in the Levice District in the Nitra Region of Slovakia.

== History ==
In historical records the village was first mentioned in 1307.

== Geography ==
The municipality lies at an altitude of 136 metres (446 ft) and covers an area of 25.54 km^{2} (9.86 sq mi) (2025).

== Population ==
Population statistic (10 years)
Year	1995	2005	2015	2025
Count	641	658	644	589
Difference		+2.65%	−2.12%	−8.54%

Population statistic
Year	2024	2025
Count	602	589
Difference		−2.15%

It has a population of 589 people (31 December 2025).

=== Ethnicity ===
Census 2021 (1+ %)
Ethnicity	Number	Fraction
Slovak	433	69.05%
Hungarian	150	23.92%
Not found out	63	10.04%
Jewish	9	1.43%
Total	627	

In year 2021 was 627 people by ethnicity 433 as Slovak, 150 as Hungarian, 63 as Not found out, 9 as Jewish, 4 as Czech, 2 as Romani, 1 as Rusyn and 1 as Romanian.

Note on population: The difference values of population numbers in the table "Population statistic" and in the sections "Ethnicity" & "Religion" is caused by the use of various statistical methods.

=== Religion ===
Census 2021 (1+ %)
Religion	Number	Fraction
Roman Catholic Church	244	38.92%
None	213	33.97%
Not found out	56	8.93%
Calvinist Church	40	6.38%
Evangelical Church	40	6.38%
Other	10	1.59%
Jehovah's Witnesses	8	1.28%
Total	627	

In year 2021 was 627 people by religion 244 from Roman Catholic Church, 213 from None, 56 from Not found out, 40 from Calvinist Church, 40 from Evangelical Church, 10 from Other, 8 from Jehovah's Witnesses, 5 from Greek Catholic Church, 4 from Old Catholic Church, 4 from Ad hoc movements, 2 from Christian Congregations in Slovakia and 1 from Other and not ascertained christian church.

== Facilities ==
The village has a public library and football pitch.
