= Notion (ancient city) =

Ancient Greek city

- Νότιον (Greek)
- Notium
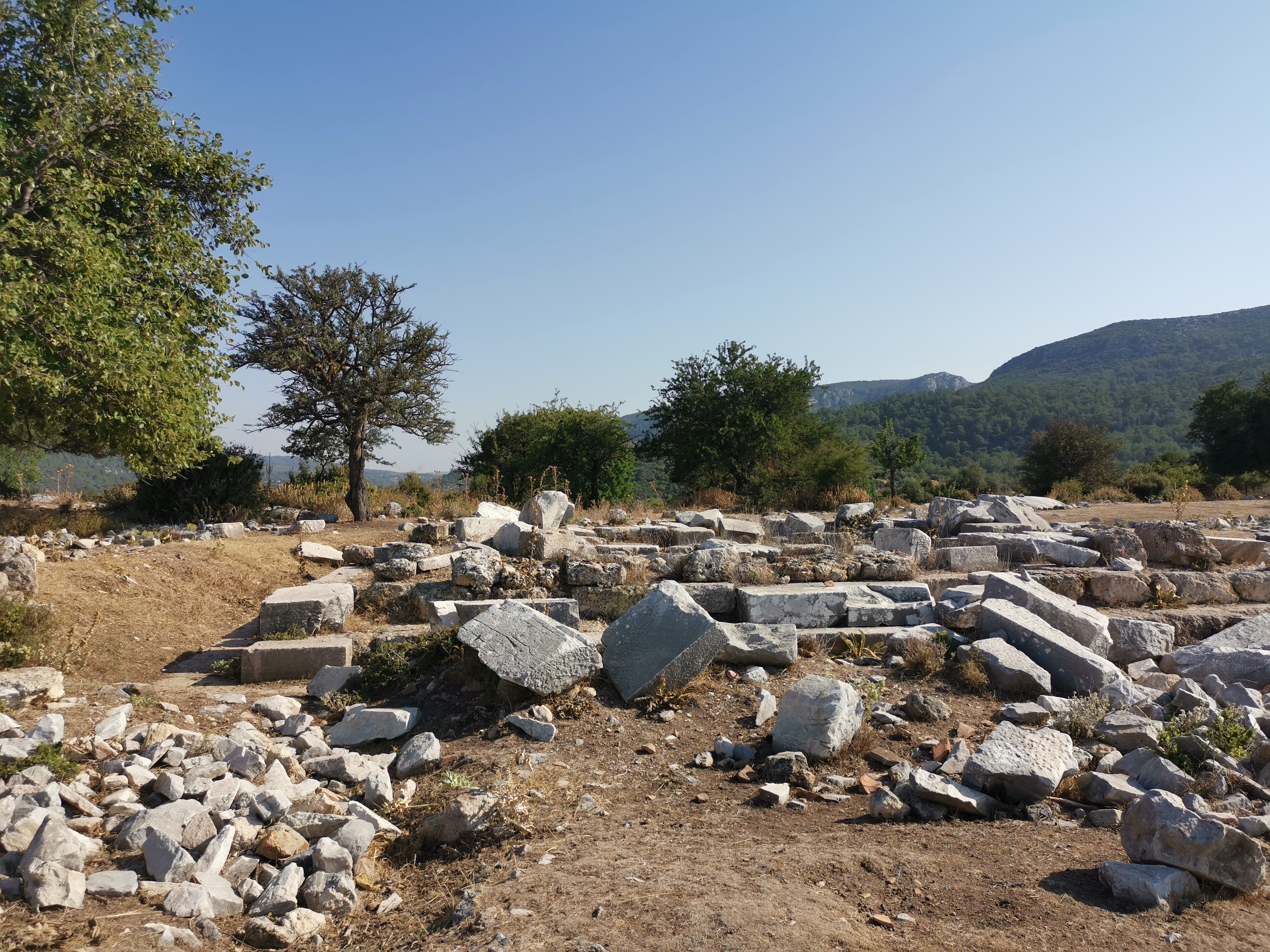
- The Temple of Athena at Notion in July 2025

- Location within Turkey
- 37°59′34″N 27°11′51″E
- Type: Settlement
- Location: Ahmetbeyli, İzmir Province, Turkey
- Region: Ionia

History
- Event: Battle of Notium

Notion or Notium (Ancient Greek Νότιον, 'southern') was a Greek city-state on the west coast of Anatolia; it is about 50 kilometers (31 mi) south of İzmir in modern Turkey, on the Gulf of Kuşadası. Notion was located on a hill from which the sea was visible; it served as a port for nearby Colophon and Claros, and pilgrims frequently passed through on their way to the oracle of Apollo at Claros. There are still remains of the defense walls, necropolis, temple, agora, and theater. The ruins of the city are now found east of the modern town Ahmetbeyli in the Menderes district of İzmir Province, Turkey.

The earliest reference to Notion is in Herodotus, who includes it among the cities of Aeolis (of which it is the southernmost): "Kyme, which is called Phriconis, Larisai, Neon-teichos, Temnos, Killa, Notion, Aigiroëssa, Pitane, Aigaiai, Myrina, Grynei" (I:149). Its proximity to the Ionian city of Colophon needs explanation; we may "suppose either that the Ionian settlers negotiated their rights of passage up to their inland site or more probably that they reached it originally up one of the other river valleys." Robin Lane Fox, discussing the early rivalry between the cities, writes:

Relations between Colophon and nearby Notion were never easy and their bitter rivalry may help to explain the story of a quarrel between the two prophets at Claros. The Aeolian Greeks at Notion had a special relationship with Aeolian Mopsus, but the Ionian Greeks at Colophon had a special relationship with Calchas. It was, then, particularly appealing for the Aeolian controllers of Claros to claim that Mopsus had outwitted Calchas and caused his death on the site.

Herbert William Parke suggests that in the seventh century BC "Claros was in the control of Notion, which must have remained a small Aeolian town dominated by its more powerful inland neighbour [Colophon], but also protected by it against the threat of Lydia. Notion itself was not big enough to send out colonies on its own." Persia conquered Colophon and Notion in the mid-sixth century BC, but they were liberated in the Greco–Persian Wars and joined the Delian League separately (Colophon paying three talents a year, the smaller Notion only a third of a talent).

During the first years of the Peloponnesian War, Notion was split into factions, one of which called in mercenaries under Persian command; the Athenian admiral Paches ruthlessly restored the pro-Athenian faction to power, "and settlers were afterwards sent out from Athens, and the place colonized according to Athenian laws" (Thucydides III:34). Thereafter it served as an Athenian base. In 406 BC it was the site of the Spartan victory at the Battle of Notium. By the late fourth century BC it was joined in a sympoliteia (federal league) with Colophon and "by the Roman period the name of Notion dropped out of use completely."

Archaeological expeditions, carried out in part by the University of Michigan, resumed in 2022. In July 2023, a small hoard of 68 gold persian darics was found buried underneath the walls of one of the houses. According to Christopher Ratté, one of the lead archaeologists on the expedition, the hoard may have been left by a soldier for safekeeping.

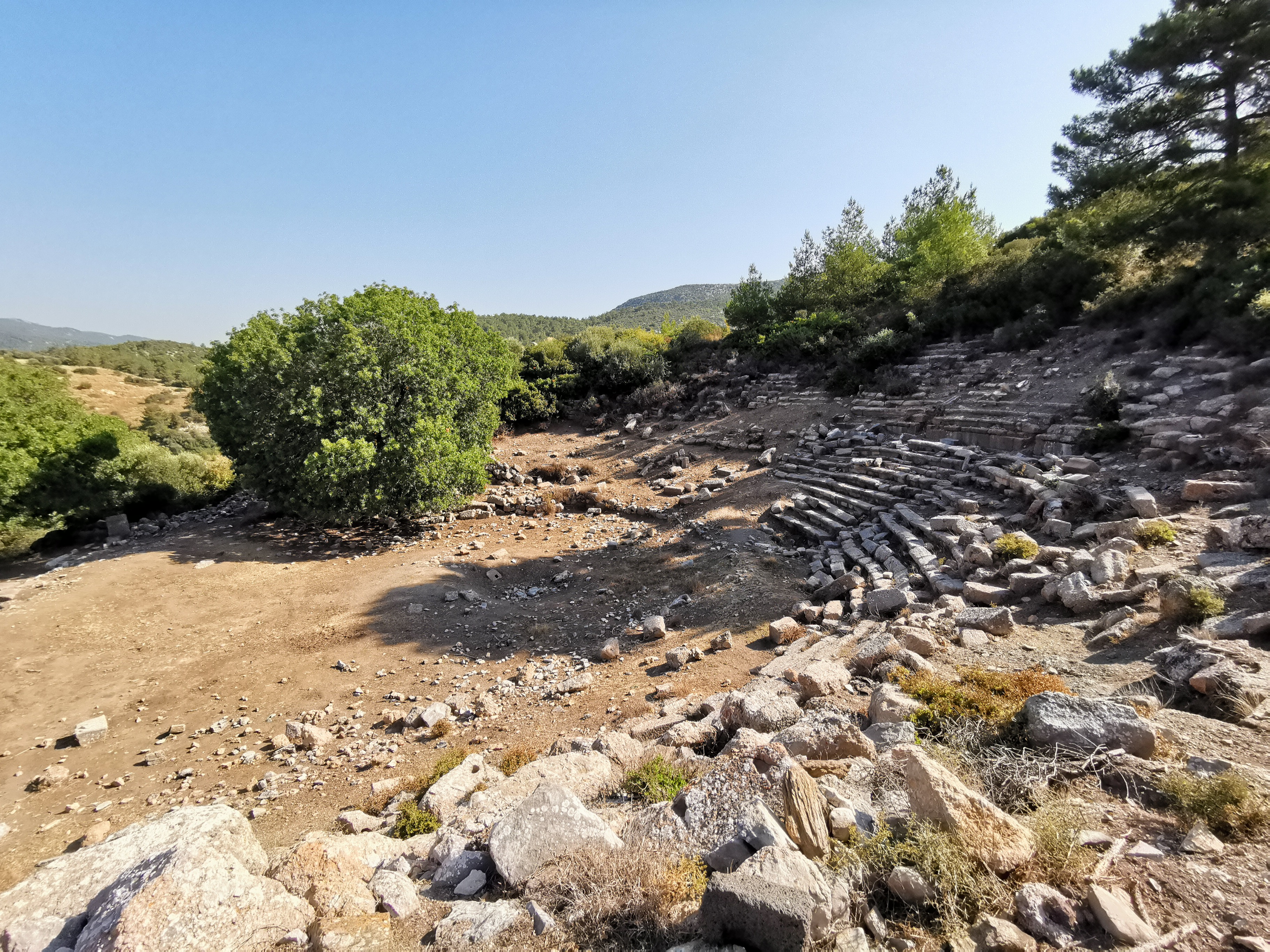
Ruined theatre of Notion ancient city in Asia Minor
