= Aspasia =

5th-century BC partner of Athenian statesman Pericles

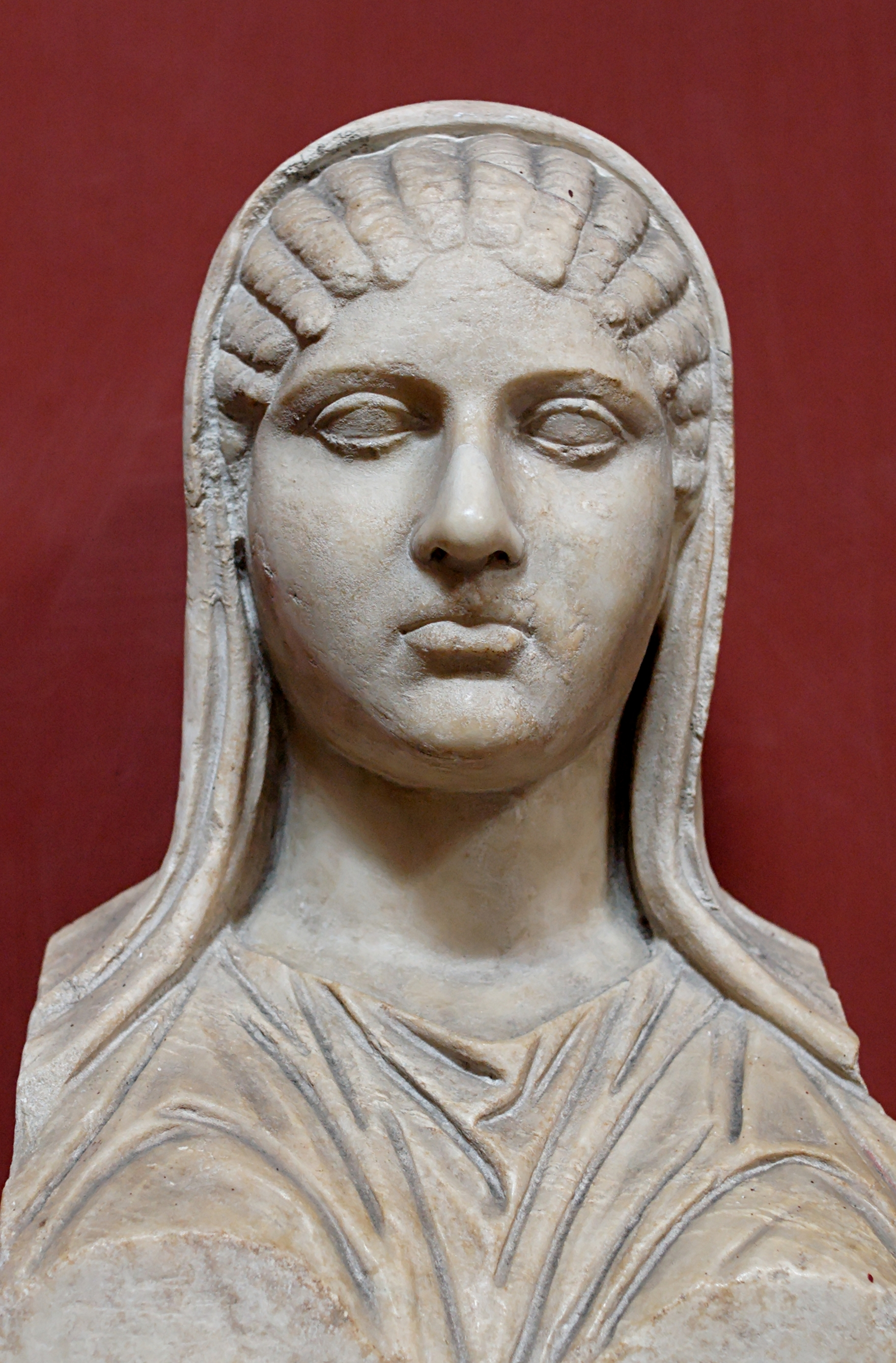
Marble portrait herm identified by an inscription as Aspasia, possibly copied from her grave.

Aspasia (Note: /æˈspeɪʒ(i)ə, -ziə, -ʃə/; Ancient Greek: Ἀσπασία Greek: [aspasíaː]) (c. 470 – after 428 BC (Note: Aspasia's date of birth and death are uncertain. Her birthdate is inferred to be c. 470 BC based on the birthdates of her children; nothing is known of her life after her supposed relationship with Lysicles (429–428 BC).)) was a metic woman who lived in Classical Athens. Born in Miletus, she moved to Athens and began a relationship with the statesman Pericles. According to the traditional historical narrative, she worked as a hetaira, though modern scholars have questioned the factual basis for this claim, which derives from ancient comedy. Though Aspasia is one of the best-attested women from the Greco-Roman world, and the most important woman in the history of fifth-century Athens, almost nothing is certain about her life.

Aspasia's relationship with Pericles began between 452 and 441 BC. Both ancient and modern scholars have variously described her as Pericles's concubine and as his de jure or de facto wife. They had a son, Pericles the Younger; Pericles may also have defended her against a charge of asebeia (impiety) recorded in traditional accounts of Aspasia's life. As with her status as a courtesan, this narrative may also stem from Athenian comedy, and several modern scholars have questioned its historicity. After Pericles's death in 429 BC, she is believed to have married the politician Lysicles; nothing is known of Aspasia's life after his death in 428 BC.

Athenian writers of Old Comedy portrayed Aspasia as a prostitute and madam, with improper and excessive control over Pericles; this approach was also adopted by the Roman-era biographer Plutarch. Ancient philosophical writers portrayed her as a skilled rhetorician and philosopher; she may have been a model for the character of Diotima in the Symposium of Plato. Early modern receptions of Aspasia generally followed this latter approach, though Plutarch's characterisation of her became more prominent in nineteenth-century portrayals of her. From the twentieth century, she has been portrayed as both a sexualised and sexually liberated woman, and as a feminist role model fighting for women's rights in ancient Athens.

== Sources ==
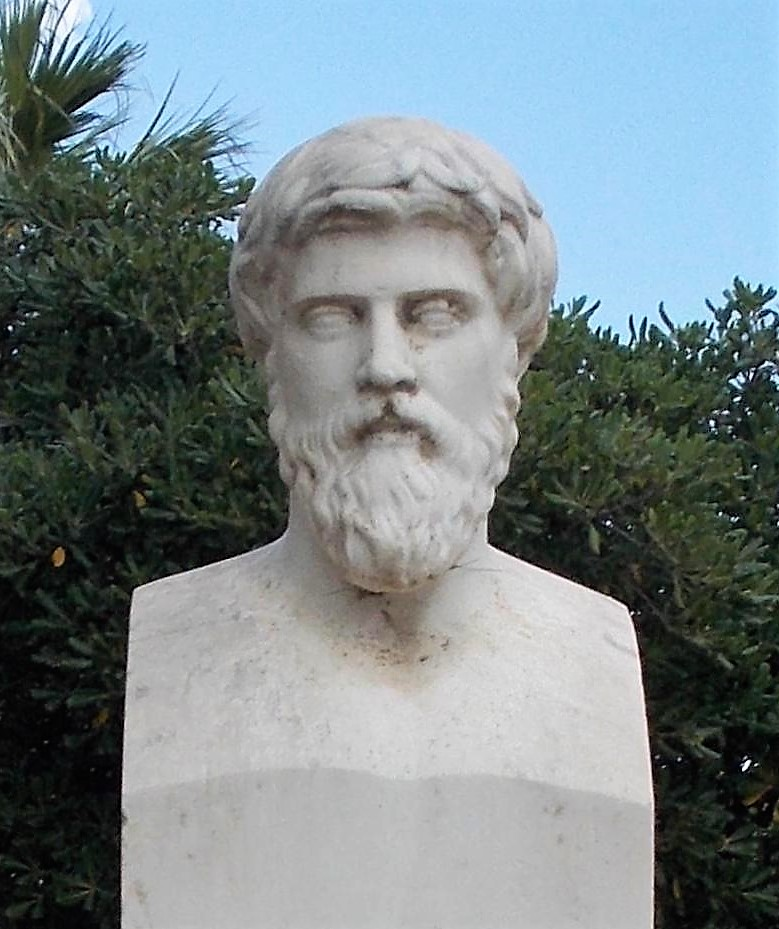
Bust of Plutarch, the main ancient source for the life of Aspasia

We must make do with the sources that mention her, even when they fundamentally distort reality.

— Nicole Loraux, "Aspasia, Foreigner, Intellectual".

Aspasia was an important figure in the history of fifth-century Athens, and is one of the women from the Greco-Roman world with the most substantial biographical traditions. The earliest literary sources to mention Aspasia, written during her lifetime, are from Athenian comedy, and in the fourth century BC she appears in Socratic dialogues. After the fourth century, she appears only in brief mentions of complete texts, or in fragments whose full context is now lost, until the second century AD, when Plutarch wrote his Life of Pericles, the longest and most complete ancient biographical treatment of Aspasia. Modern biographies of Aspasia are dependent on Plutarch, despite his writing nearly seven centuries after her death.

It is difficult to draw any firm conclusions about the real Aspasia from any of these sources: as Robert Wallace puts it, "for us Aspasia herself possesses and can possess almost no historical reality". Aside from her name, father's name, and place of birth, Aspasia's biography is almost entirely unverifiable, and the ancient writings about her are frequently more of a projection of their own (without exception male) preconceptions than they are historical fact. Madeleine Henry's full-length biography covers what is known of Aspasia's life in only nine pages.

== Life ==
=== Early life ===
Aspasia was born, probably no earlier than 470 BC, (Note: This date is derived from the birthdates of Aspasia's two sons: Pericles the Younger between 452 and 440, and Poristes in 428 BC. However, some scholars doubt the existence of Aspasia's second son; in that case, Aspasia could have been born some time earlier than 470.) in the Ionian Greek city of Miletus (Note: Athenaeus quotes Heraclides of Pontus as saying that Aspasia came from Megara; this apparently derives from a misunderstanding of Aristophanes' Acharnians.) (in modern Aydın Province, Turkey), the daughter of a man called Axiochus. A scholiast on Aelius Aristides wrongly claims that Aspasia was a Carian prisoner of war and a slave; this is perhaps due to confusion with the concubine of Cyrus the Younger, also called Aspasia. The circumstances surrounding Aspasia's move to Athens are unknown. One theory, first put forward by Peter Bicknell based on a fourth-century tomb inscription, suggests that Alcibiades of Scambonidae, the grandfather of the famous Alcibiades, married Aspasia's sister while he was in exile in Miletus following his ostracism, and Aspasia went with him when he returned to Athens. Bicknell speculates that this was motivated by the death of Aspasia's father Axiochus in the upheaval in Miletus following its secession from the Delian League in 455/4 BC.

=== Life in Athens ===
Pericles Attends the Lectures of Aspasia. Drawing by Edward Francis Burney.

According to the conventional understanding of Aspasia's life, she worked as a courtesan and then ran a brothel. Some scholars have challenged this view. Peter Bicknell notes that the "pejorative epithets applied to her by comic dramatists" are unreliable. Madeleine Henry argues in her biography of Aspasia that "we are not required to believe that Aspasia was a whore because a comic poet says she was", and that the portrayal of Aspasia as involved in the sex trade should "be looked upon with great suspicion". Cheryl Glenn contends that Aspasia actually opened an academy for women that became "a popular salon for the most influential men of the day", including Socrates, Plato, and Pericles, and Rebecca Futo Kennedy suggests that the accusations in comedy that she was a brothel-keeper derived from this. Despite these challenges to the traditional narrative, many scholars continue to believe that Aspasia worked as a courtesan or madam. Konstantinos Kapparis argues that the kinds of comic attacks made on Aspasia would not have been acceptable to make about a respectable woman, and that it is therefore likely that Aspasia did have a history as a sex worker before she began her relationship with Pericles. Whether or not Aspasia worked as a courtesan, her later life, in which she apparently achieved some degree of power, reputation, and independence, has similarities to the lives of other prominent hetairai ("courtesans") such as Phryne, Kapparis writes.

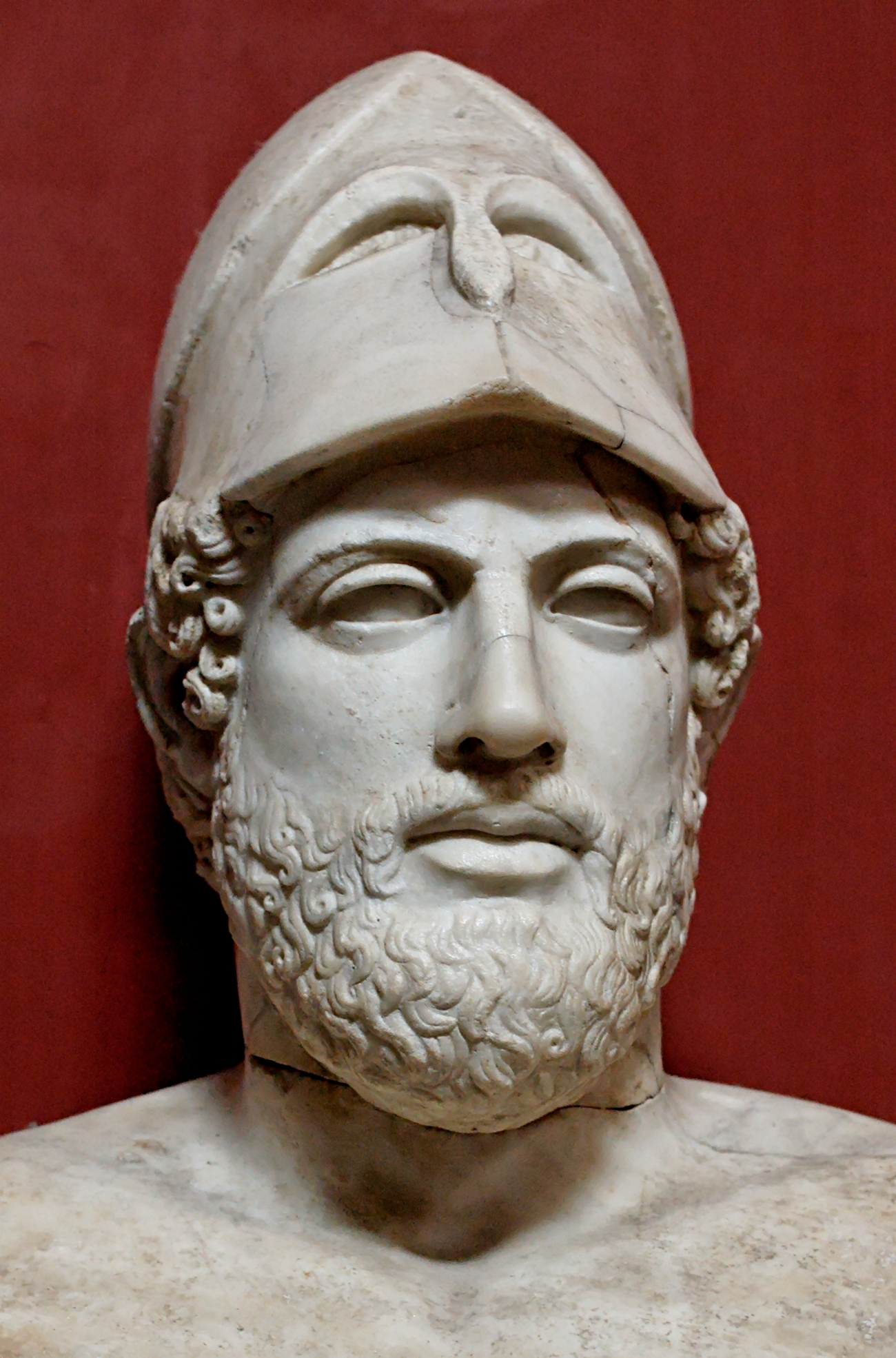
Bust of Pericles

In Athens, Aspasia met and began a relationship with the statesman Pericles. It is uncertain how they met; if Bicknell's thesis is correct then she may have met him through his connection to Alcibiades' household. Kennedy speculates that when Cleinias, the son of the elder Alcibiades, died at the Battle of Coronea, Pericles may have become the kurios (guardian) of Aspasia. Aspasia's relationship with Pericles began some time between 452 and 441. (Note: Pericles and Aspasia's relationship began after Pericles' first marriage, which cannot have ended before 452/1, the earliest possible birthdate for Pericles' second legitimate son, Paralus. It must have begun by 441/0, the latest possible date for the conception of Pericles the Younger, who was at least 30 in 410/9 when he was hellenotamias.) The exact nature of Pericles and Aspasia's relationship is disputed. Ancient authors variously portrayed her as a prostitute, his concubine, or his wife. Modern scholars are also divided. Rebecca Futo Kennedy argues that they were married; Debra Nails describes Aspasia as "the de facto wife of Pericles"; Madeleine Henry believes that Pericles' citizenship law of 451/0 made marriage between an Athenian and a metic illegal, and suggests a quasi-marital pallakia ("concubinage") enforced by contract; and Sue Blundell describes Aspasia as a hetaira and mistress of Pericles.

Aspasia and Pericles had a son, Pericles the Younger, born no later than 440/39 BC. (Note: Pericles the Younger was at least 30 in 410/9, when he was hellenotamias, and therefore was born no later than 440/39.) At the time of Pericles the Younger's birth, Pericles had two legitimate sons, Paralus and Xanthippus. In 430/29, after the death of his two elder sons, Pericles proposed an amendment to his citizenship law of 451/0 which would have made Pericles the Younger able to become a citizen and inherit. Though many scholars believe that this was specifically for Pericles, some have suggested that a more general exception was introduced, in response to the effect of the Plague of Athens and Peloponnesian War on citizen families.

According to Plutarch, Aspasia was prosecuted for asebeia (impiety) by the comic poet Hermippus. She was supposedly defended by Pericles and acquitted. Many scholars have questioned whether this trial ever took place, suggesting that the tradition derives from a fictional trial of Aspasia in a play by Hermippus. Vincent Azoulay compares the trial of Aspasia to those of Phidias and Anaxagoras, both also connected to Pericles, and concludes that "none of the trials for impiety involving those close to Pericles is attested with certainty".

In 429 BC, Pericles died. According to ancient sources, Aspasia then married another politician, Lysicles, and gave birth to another son, Poristes. As "Poristes" is not otherwise known as a name – it means "supplier" or "provider", and was a euphemism for "thief" – some scholars have argued that the name comes from a misunderstanding of a joke in a comedy. Henry doubts whether Aspasia had a child with Lysicles, and Kennedy questions whether she married Lysicles at all. Pomeroy, however, suggests that Poristes' unusual name may have been chosen by Lysicles for political reasons, to draw attention to his providing for the people of Athens. Lysicles died a year after Pericles, in 428, and nothing is recorded of Aspasia's life after this point. It is unknown where or when she died.

== Legacy ==
=== Ancient reception ===
In the classical period, two primary schools of thought developed around Aspasia. One tradition, deriving from Old Comedy, emphasises her influence over Pericles and her involvement in the sex trade; the other, which can be traced back to fourth-century philosophy, concentrates on her intellect and rhetorical skill. Some scholars have also proposed that the portrayal of several female characters in Athenian tragedy commented on Aspasia, including Euripides' Medea and Phaedra, and Sophocles' Jocasta.

==== Comic tradition ====
The only surviving ancient sources to discuss Aspasia which were written during her life are from comedy. The surviving comic tradition about Aspasia – unlike her male contemporaries – focuses on her sexuality. Aristophanes, the only writer of Old Comedy for whom complete works survive, refers to Aspasia only once in his surviving corpus, in Acharnians. In a passage parodying the beginning of Herodotus' Histories, Aristophanes jokes that the Megarian decree was retaliation for the kidnapping of two pornai ("prostitutes") from Aspasia. A similar charge, attributed by Plutarch to Duris of Samos, that Aspasia was responsible for Athens' involvement in the Samian War, may have derived from this. (Note: Alternatively, Loraux suggests that Aristophanes based his joke on an unknown earlier comic author, who had already implicated Aspasia in starting the Samian War.) The mention of Aspasia's pornai in Acharnians is also the earliest known instance of the tradition that she worked as a brothel-keeper.

Outside of Aristophanes, mentions of Aspasia are known from the surviving fragments of Cratinus and Eupolis. In a fragment of Cratinus' Cheirons, Aspasia is described as "Hera-Aspasia, a dog-eyed concubine". Eupolis mentions Aspasia by name in three surviving fragments. In Proslapatians, she is compared to Helen of Troy – like Aspasia, blamed for starting a war – and in Philoi to Omphale, who owned Herakles as a slave. Eupolis also alluded to Aspasia in Demes, where Pericles, having been brought back from the dead, asks after his son; he is informed that he is alive, but is ashamed of having a porne as a mother. Aspasia is also known to have been mentioned by Kallias, though the scholion to Plato's Menexenus which reports this is garbled and it is uncertain what Kallias said about her. She may also have appeared in a play by Hermippus – this is possibly the source of the anecdote told by Plutarch that Aspasia was prosecuted by him for asebeia and for supplying free-born women for Pericles to have sex with. Later authors to follow the comic tradition in focusing on Aspasia's sexuality and improper influence over Pericles, for example in Clearchus' Erotika.

==== Philosophical tradition ====
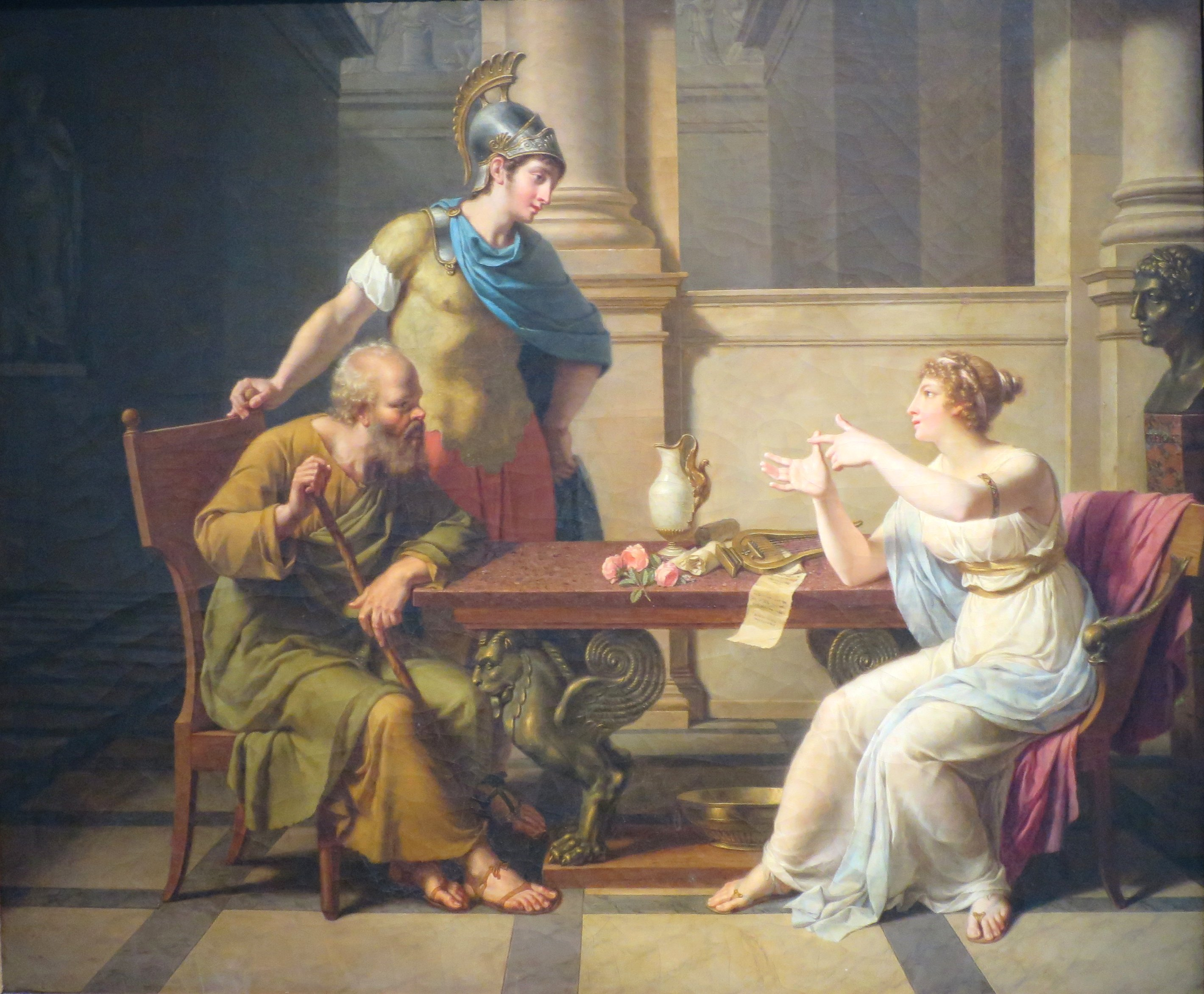
In a tradition that can be traced back to the fourth century BC, Aspasia was a skilled rhetorician. In this painting by Nicolas-André Monsiau, she speaks while Socrates and Alcibiades listen attentively.

In the fourth century, four philosophers are known to have written Socratic dialogues which feature Aspasia: Antisthenes, Plato, Aeschines and Xenophon. Armand D'Angour has argued that the character of Diotima in Plato's Symposium, to whom Socrates attributes his understanding of love, is also based on her. In the dialogues by Plato, Xenophon, and Aeschines, Aspasia is portrayed as an educated, skilled rhetorician, and a source of advice for marital concerns. Antisthenes' depiction of Aspasia was apparently more critical, portraying her as controlling Pericles with her femininity.

In the Hellenistic and Roman periods, some authors followed Aspasia's more positive portrayal in Socratic literature, distancing her from prostitution and situating her in a tradition of wise women. Didymus Chalcenterus wrote about exceptional women in history in his Symposiaka, downplaying her sexuality but noting her influence on Socrates' philosophy and Pericles' rhetoric. Both Athenaeus and Maximus of Tyre report that Socrates advised Callias to have Aspasia teach his son. In Rome, Cicero and Quintillian used the conversation between Aspasia and Xenophon in Aeschines' dialogue as a good example of inductio.

=== Modern reception ===
Aspasia's earliest post-classical portrayal is in the letters of Héloïse to Abelard. Héloïse cites Aspasia's conversation with Xenophon and his wife in Aeschines' dialogue, which she probably knew through Cicero's reference to it, and proposes Aspasia as an example for how she should live her own life.

In the late medieval and early modern periods, Aspasia appeared in several catalogues, a fashionable genre at the time. She was included in three "medallion books", with an imagined portrait and a brief biography. The first of these was Guillaume Rouille's Promptuarium Iconum, which derives its depiction of Aspasia from Plutarch and focuses on her relationship with Pericles; in Giovanni Angelo Canini's Iconografia, Aspasia is depicted wearing a helmet and shield. Aspasia also featured in two catalogues of women in this period as a teacher and philosopher: in Arcangela Tarabotti's Tirannia Paterna, which portrays her as a teacher of rhetoric, and Gilles Ménage's Historia Mulierum Philosopharum, in which Aspasia is described as teaching rhetoric to Pericles and Socrates, and philosophy to Socrates.

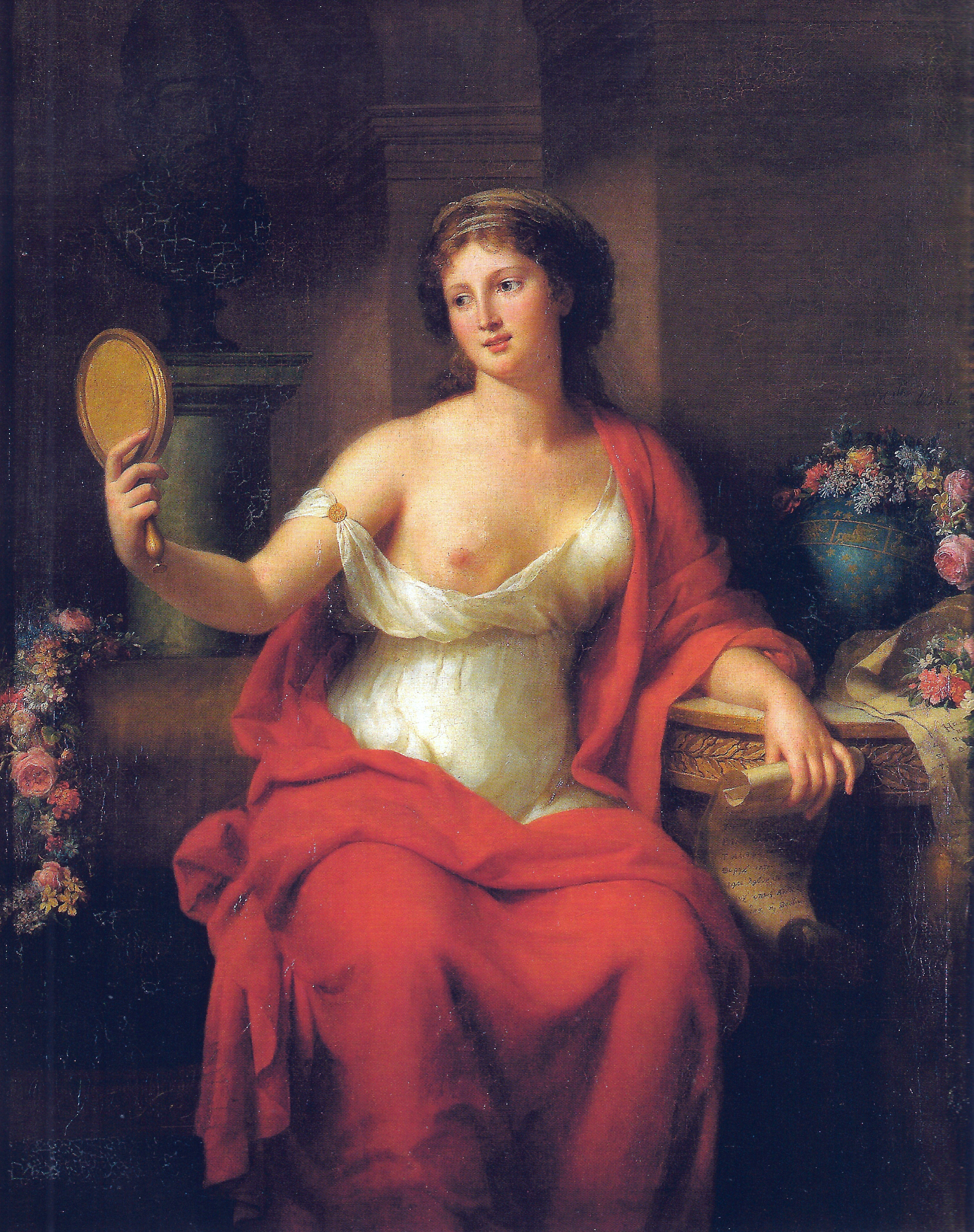
Marie Bouliard's 1794 portrait of Aspasia

By the eighteenth century, Aspasia was widely enough known to be included in dictionaries and encyclopedias, where depictions of her were largely based on Plutarch. In 1736, Jean Leconte de Bièvre published the Histoire de deux Aspasies, also based on Plutarch's depiction, which portrayed Aspasia as an educated woman and Pericles' teacher as well as his wife. The eighteenth century also saw the first known image of Aspasia to be created by a woman, Marie Bouliard's Aspasie. The painting depicts Aspasia with one breast bared, looking into a handheld mirror and with a scroll in her other hand. Though the bare breast references the eroticised traditions surrounding Aspasia, Madeleine Henry argues that the portrait differs from more pornographic depictions of women, with Aspasia looking into the mirror rather than out at the viewer, and holding a scroll rather than a cosmetic object such as a comb.

In the nineteenth century, Plutarch's narrative dominated the interpretation of Aspasia in both novels and paintings. In the visual arts, the sexualised side of Aspasia was represented by Jean-Léon Gérôme's painting Socrates Seeking Alcibiades in the House of Aspasia, but this pornographised representation was relatively uncommon. Honoré Daumier's lithograph of Socrates at the House of Aspasia depicts Aspasia as a "lorette", an ambiguous social position which referred to "loose, vulgar or 'liberated' women". Other artists of the period depicted an Aspasia active in public life, and interacting with the most renowned men of the period. In Henry Holiday's painting of Aspasia on the Pnyx, she is shown with another woman at the site of the Athenian assembly, the center of male public space in the city, while in two paintings by Nicolas-André Monsiau she is shown at the centre of discussions with celebrated Athenian intellectuals and politicians. In Socrates and Aspasia, she converses with Socrates and Pericles; in Aspasia in Conversation with the Most Illustrious Men of Athens, Euripides, Sophocles, Plato, and Xenophon are also among those included. In both of these paintings, Aspasia is speaking and commanding the attention of these men. Melissa Ianetta argues that Germaine de Staël's novel Corinne models its heroine after Aspasia, placing her in the same tradition of feminine rhetorical skill.

An alternative nineteenth-century representation of Aspasia positioned her as a respectable wife. The authors Walter Savage Landor and Elizabeth Lynn Linton portrayed Aspasia as a good Victorian wife to Pericles in their novels Pericles and Aspasia and Amymone: A Romance of the Days of Pericles. Lawrence Alma-Tadema's painting Phidias and the Frieze of the Parthenon also shows Aspasia as a respectable companion to men. By contrast, Robert Hamerling's novel Aspasia showed her as a proto-feminist with far more agency than these romanticised accounts.

The twentieth century saw on the one hand increasing interest in Aspasia separately from her relationships with men, and on the other more prurient concern with her sexuality. The former strand of Aspasia's reception saw the Latvian author, feminist, and politician Elza Rozenberga, who took the pseudonym Aspazija, model her campaigning for women's rights after what she saw as Aspasia's example. Aspasia was also taken as a feminist role-model by Judy Chicago, who included her as one of the thirty-nine women given a place in her artwork The Dinner Party. Recent novels have tended towards the more explicitly sexualised portrayal of Aspasia, including Achilles His Armour by the classicist Peter Green, Madelon Dimont's Darling Pericles, and Taylor Caldwell's Glory and Lightning, in which Aspasia is raised as a courtesan. The 2018 video game Assassin's Creed Odyssey, which features Aspasia in a major role, follows the ancient tradition which portrayed her as a hetaira. She is depicted as using her femininity to gain political power by manipulating men and through her connections to other women across the Greek world.

== Bibliography ==
- Azoulay, Vincent (2014) [Published in French 2010]. Pericles of Athens. Translated by Lloyd, Janet. Princeton University Press. ISBN 978-0-691-15459-6.
- Bicknell, Peter J. (1982). "Axiochus Alkibiadou, Aspasia and Aspasios". L'Antiquité Classique. 51 (3): 240–250. doi:10.3406/antiq.1982.2070.
- Boys-Stone, George; Rowe, Christopher (2013). The Circle of Socrates: Readings in the First-generation Socratics. Indianopolis: Hackett. ISBN 9781603849364.
- Blundell, Sue (1995). Women in Ancient Greece. Harvard University Press. ISBN 978-0-674-95473-1.
- D'Angour, Armand (2019). Socrates in Love. Bloomsbury. ISBN 978-14-08-88391-4.
- Diamantakou-Agathou, Kaiti (2020). "From Aspasia to Lysistrata: Literary Versions and Intertextual Diffusions of the Feminine Other in Classical Athens" (PDF). Logeion. 10: 238–260.
- Fornara, Charles W.; Samons, Loren J. (1991). Athens from Cleisthenes to Pericles. Berkeley, CA: University of California Press.
- Geraths, Cory; Kennerly, Michele (2016). "Painted Lady: Aspasia in Nineteenth-Century European Art". Rhetoric Review. 35 (3): 197–211. doi:10.1080/07350198.2016.1178688. S2CID 148042837.
- Glenn, Cheryl (1994). "Sex, Lies, and Manuscript: Refiguring Aspasia in the History of Rhetoric". College Composition and Communication. 45 (2): 180–199. doi:10.2307/359005. JSTOR 359005.
- Henry, Madeleine M. (1995). Prisoner of History. Aspasia of Miletus and her Biographical Tradition. Oxford University Press. ISBN 978-0-19-508712-3.
- Ianetta, Melissa (2008). "'She Must Be a Rare One': Aspasia, 'Corinne', and the Improvisatrice Tradition". PMLA. 123 (1): 92–108. JSTOR 25501829.
- Jordan, Nicole (2012). "A Very Amusing Bit of Blasphemy": Honoré Daumier's Histoire Ancienne (Thesis). University of Alabama.
- Kapparis, Konstantinos (2018). Prostitution in the Ancient Greek World. Berlin: De Gruyter. ISBN 978-3-11-055795-4.
- Kassel, Rudolf; Austin, Colin, eds. (1983). Poetae Comici Graeci. Vol. IV Aristophon – Crobylus. Berlin: Walter de Gruyter. ISBN 978-3-11-002405-0.
- Kennedy, Rebecca Futo (2014). Immigrant Women in Athens: Gender, Ethnicity and Citizenship in the Classical City. Routledge. ISBN 978-0-415-73786-9.
- Loraux, Nicole (2021) [Published in French 2003]. "Aspasia, Foreigner, Intellectual". Journal of Continental Philosophy. 2 (1). Translated by Ling, Alex: 9–32. doi:10.5840/jcp2021102823. S2CID 240237486.
- Nails, Debra (2000). The People of Plato: A Prosopography of Plato and Other Socratics. Princeton University Press. ISBN 978-0-87220-564-2.
- Pentassuglio, Francesca (2020). "Paideutikos eros: Aspasia as an 'alter Sokrates'". Archai. 30: 1–22. doi:10.14195/1984-249X_30_15.
- Podlecki, Anthony J. (1998). Perikles and His Circle. Routledge. ISBN 978-0-415-06794-2.
- Pomeroy, Sarah B. (1996). "Review: Madeleine M. Henry, Prisoner of History". The American Journal of Philology. 117 (4): 648–651. doi:10.1353/ajp.1996.0054. JSTOR 1561953. S2CID 161551430.
- Tuplin, Roz (2022). "'We do what we must to survive': Female Sex Workers in Assassin's Creed". In Draycott, Jane; Cook, Kate (eds.). Women in Classical Video Games. London: Bloomsbury Academic. ISBN 978-1-350-24193-0.
- Vickers, Michael (2000). "Alcibiades and Aspasia: Notes on the Hippolytus". Dialogues d'histoire ancienne. 26 (2): 7–17. doi:10.3406/dha.2000.2423.
- Vickers, Michael (2014). Sophocles and Alcibiades: Athenian Politics in Ancient Greek Literature. London: Routledge. ISBN 978-1-84465-123-8.
- Wallace, Robert (1996). "Review: Madeleine M. Henry, Prisoner of History". Bryn Mawr Classical Review.
