= Diotima of Mantinea =

Ancient Greek woman or fictional figure in Plato's Symposium

- Διοτίμα Μαντινίκη
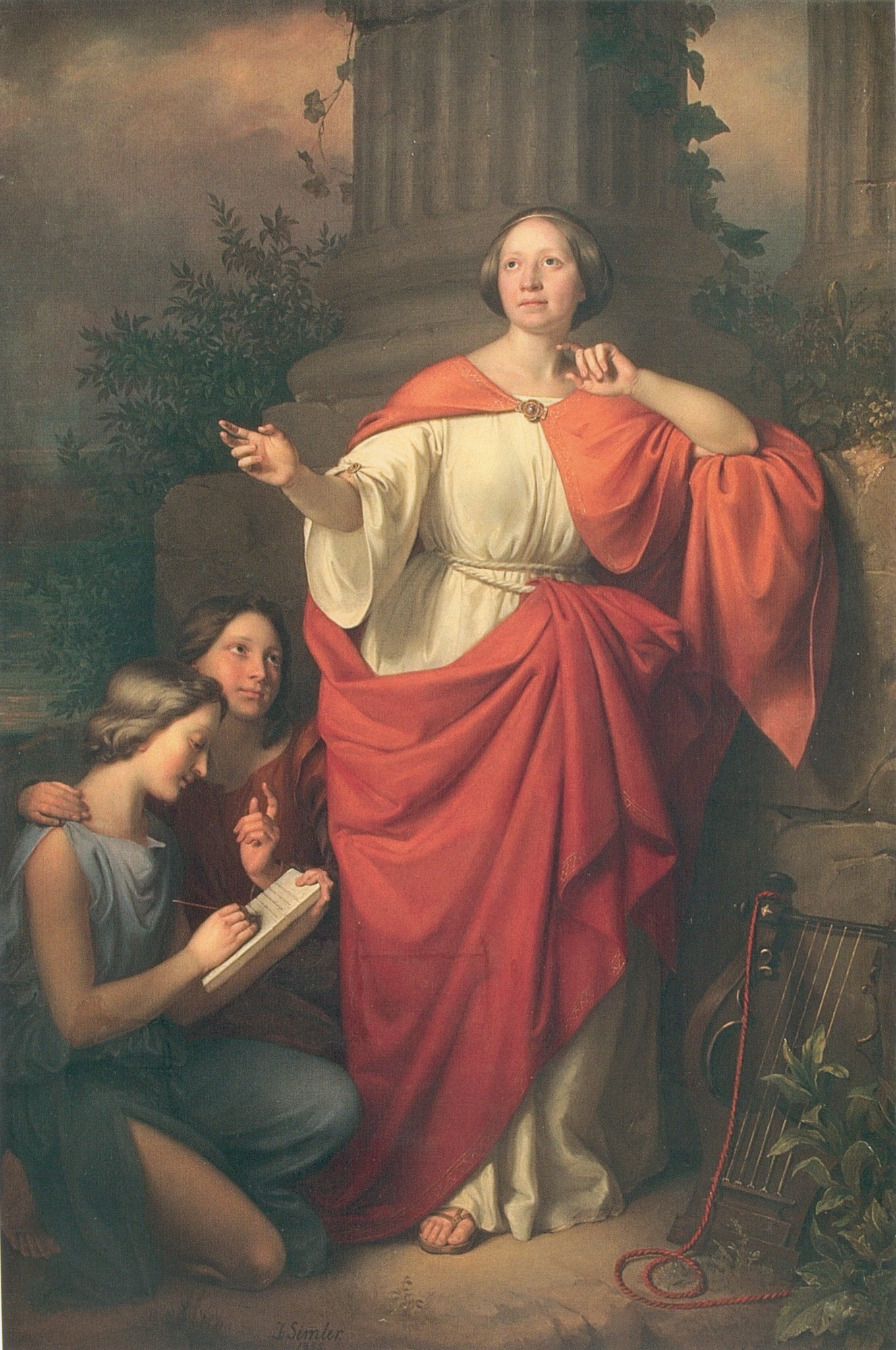
- Jadwiga Łuszczewska, who used the pen name Diotima, posing as the ancient seer in a painting by Józef Simmler, 1855

Personal life
- Died: c. 5th century BC
- Region: Mantinea, Arcadia, Northern Peloponnese
- Notable idea: Platonic love

Religious life
- Religion: Ancient Greek religion

Diotima of Mantinea (/ˌdaɪəˈtiːmə/; Greek: Διοτίμα; Latin: Diotīma) is the name or pseudonym of an ancient Greek character in Plato's dialogue Symposium, possibly an actual historical figure, indicated as having lived circa 440 B.C. Her ideas and doctrine of Eros as reported by the character of Socrates in the dialogue are the origin of the concept today known as love.

== Role in Symposium ==
In Plato's Symposium the members of a party discuss the meaning of love. Socrates says that in his youth he was taught "the philosophy of love" by Diotima, a prophetess who successfully postponed the Plague of Athens. In an account that Socrates recounts at the symposium, Diotima says that Socrates has confused the idea of love with the idea of the beloved. Love, she says, is neither fully beautiful nor good, as the earlier speakers in the dialogue had argued. Diotima gives Socrates a genealogy of Love (Eros), stating that he is the son of "resource (poros) and poverty (penia)". In her view, love drives the individual to seek beauty, first earthly beauty, or beautiful bodies. Then as a lover grows in wisdom, the beauty that is sought is spiritual, or beautiful souls. For Diotima, the most correct use of love of other human beings is to direct one's mind to love of wisdom, or philosophy.

From the Symposium Diotima's descriptor, "Mantinikê" (Mantinean) seems designed to draw attention to the word "mantis", which suggests an association with prophecy. She is further described as a foreigner (ξένη) (201e) and as wise (σοφὴ) in not only the subject of love but also of many other things (ἄλλα πολλά), she is often associated with priestcraft by a majority of scholars insofar as: 1 - she advises the Athenians on sacrifice (thusiai) which delayed the onset of a plague (201d), and 2 - her speech on eros utilizes the language of sacrifice (thusia), prophecy (mantike), purification (katharsis), mystical cultic practices like initiation (teletai) and culminates in revelations/visions (202e). In one manuscript her description was mistranscribed mantikê ('mantic woman' or seeress) rather than Mantinikê, which may be another reason for the reception of Diotima as a "priestess". Her views of love and beauty appear to center Socrates' lesson on the value of the daimonic (that which is between mortal and immortal) and "giving birth to the beautiful."

== Historicity ==
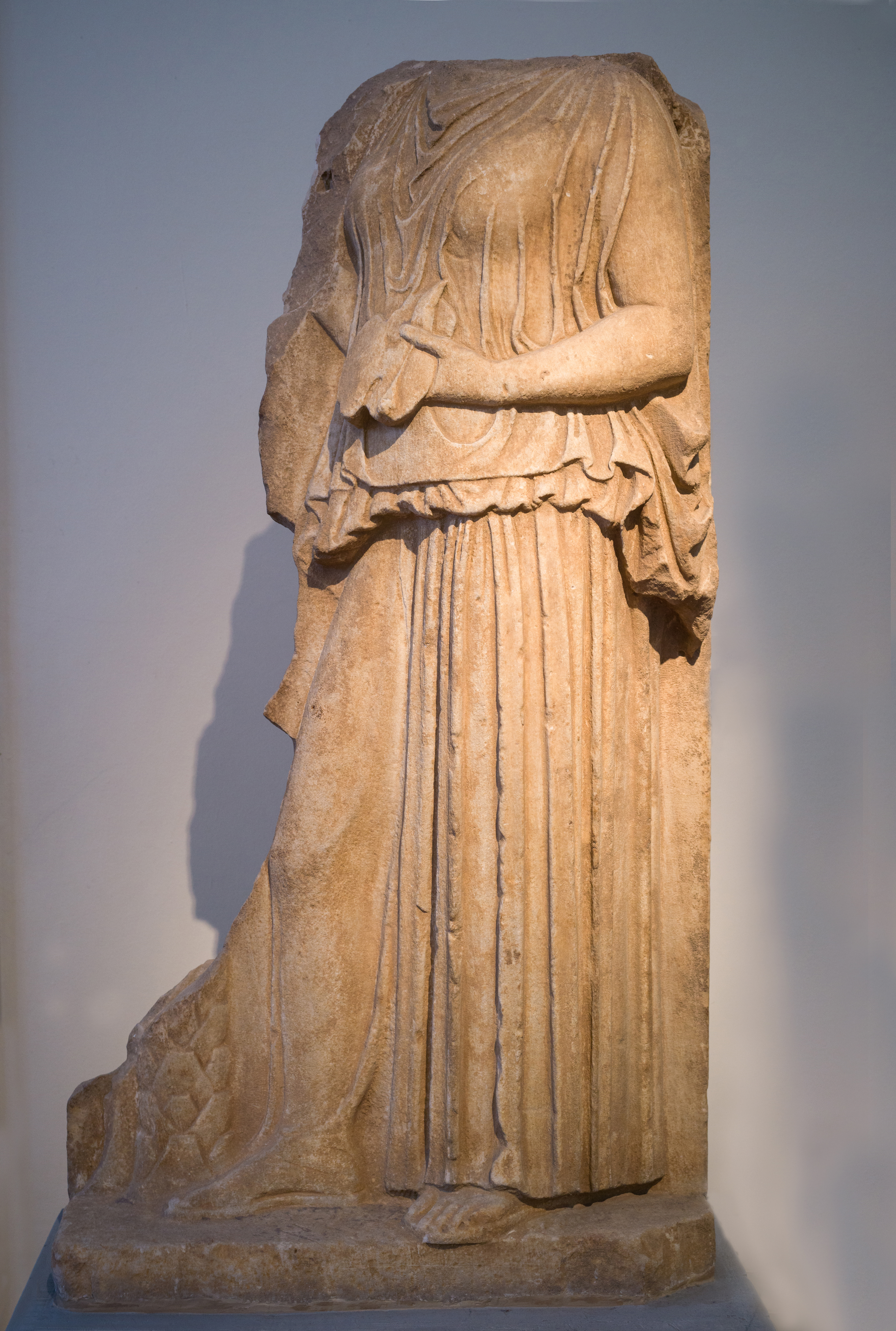
Relief of a woman holding a liver for hepatoscopy, possibly a depiction of Diotima of Mantineia.

The evidence for the existence of Diotima as a real person is sparse. Plato's Symposium is the only independent reference to her existence; all later references to her are derived from Plato. Based on this scarcity of evidence, scholars from the Renaissance through modern times have debated whether she was a real historical person who existed or a dramatic invention of Plato. Most modern scholars believe that Diotima is a fictional character invented by Plato.

=== As a fictional character ===
Marsilio Ficino, in the 15th century, was the first to suggest she might be fictional. Believing Diotima to be a fiction, Martha Nussbaum notes that Diotima's name, which means "honor the god", stands in direct contrast to Timandra ("honor the man"), who, according to Plutarch, was Alcibiades' consort.

=== As Aspasia ===
Plato was thought by some 19th- and early 20th-century scholars to have based Diotima on Aspasia, the companion of Pericles who famously impressed him by her intelligence and eloquence. This identification was recently revived by Armand D'Angour.

=== As an independent figure ===
Although in the early 20th century German scholars such as Walther Kranz and Ulrich von Wilamowitz-Moellendorf believed that Diotima was a real historical figure, modern scholars have tended not to believe this. Later in the 20th century, Mary Ellen Waithe argued that Diotima could be an independent historical woman known for her intellectual accomplishments, noting that in the Symposium, Diotima expounds ideas that are different from both Socrates's and Plato's, though with clear connections to both. More recently Irina Deretić and Nicholas Smith have advocated for Diotima's historicity. They observe that the information Plato gives about Diotima does not seem to have any particular connection to her expertise in love; they argue that if she were a fictional rather than historical figure she would be more likely to be from a city such as Corinth (whose patron deity was Aphrodite, the goddess of love) rather than Mantinea.

== See also ==
- Diotíma – Online classical studies resource
- Susette Gontard – Person
