= Adélaïde Binart =

French artist (1769–1832)

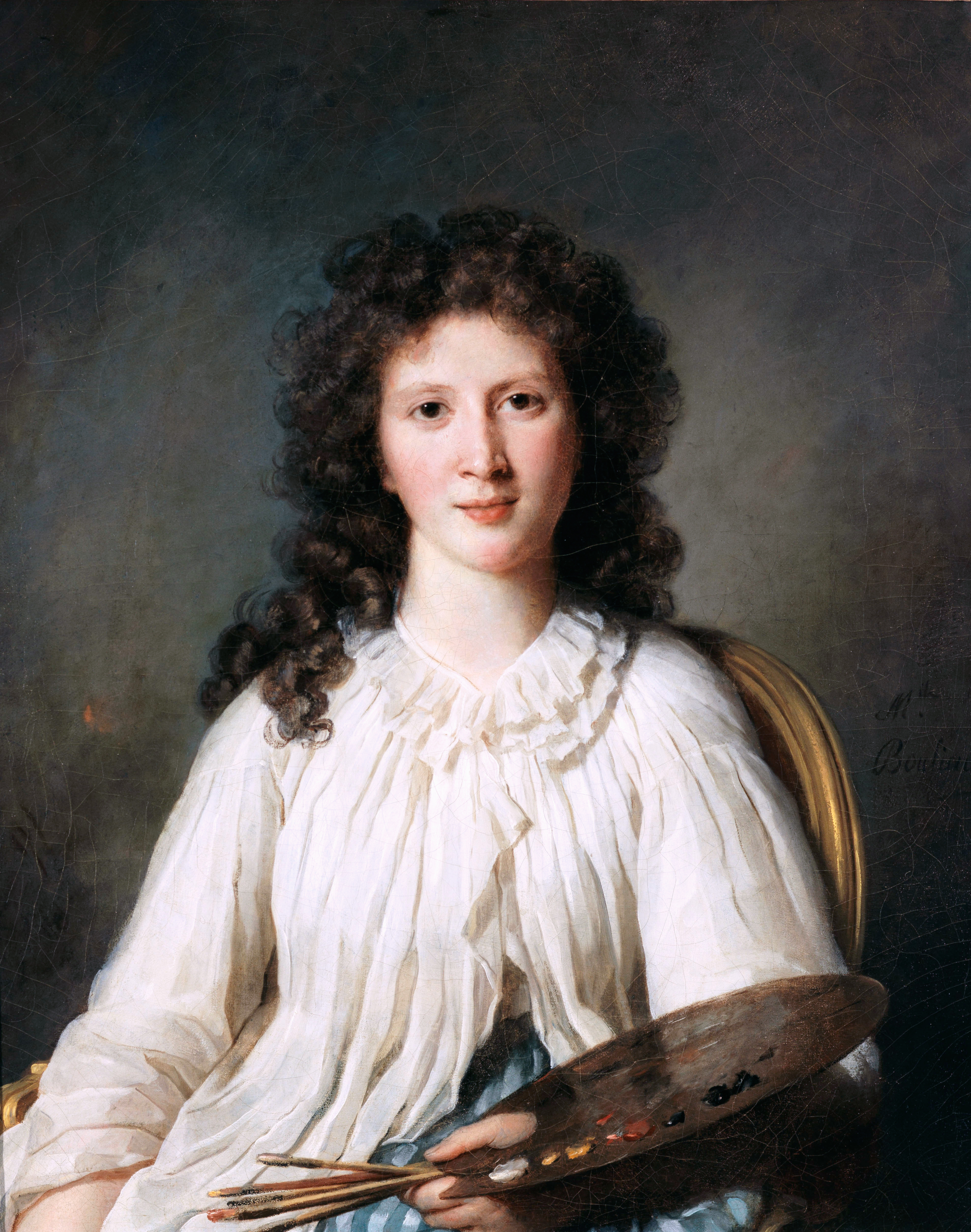
- Portrait in 1796, by Marie-Geneviève Bouliard (Paris, Musée du Carnavalet)
- Born: 9 March 1769; Paris, France
- Died: September 1832 (aged 63); Paris, France
- Spouse: Alexandre Lenoir

Adélaïde Binart (9 March 1769 – September 1832) was a French neoclassical painter-artist.

Adélaïde Binart was born 9 March 1769, in Paris. She exhibited her works, mostly portraits, at the Salon of 1795–1817. In 1794, she married Alexandre Lenoir, with whom she had three children: Zelia (1795–1813), Albert (1801–1891) and Clodomir (1804–1887). Her studio was located in the former convent of the Petits-Augustins. There are three known portraits of her: at age 27 by Marie Bouliard (1796, Paris, Musée Carnavalet), at age 30 by the artist Pierre-Maximilien Delafontaine, where she is in the company of her husband and daughter, and at age 40 (1809) by Jacques-Louis David. She died in Paris in September, 1832.

== Selected works ==
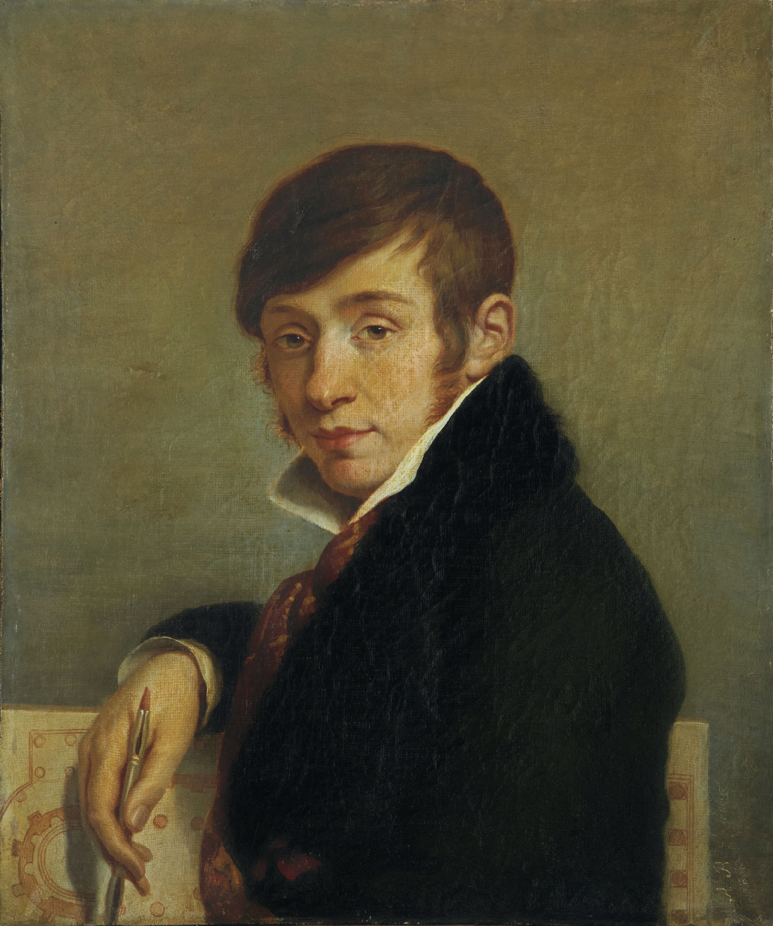
Portrait of an architect, by Adélaïde Binart, 1806, oil on canvas

- 1795, Tête d'étude
- 1799, Portrait du citoyen Gauthier de Claubri
- 1799, Portrait d'une jeune personne
- 1799, Portrait du citoyen Sage
- 1800, Portrait du citoyen P. Claude Binart
- 1801, Une dame assise avec ses enfants
- 1804, Euterpe
- 1808, Portrait de M. Dupuis
- 1816, Portrait de Mme Pasté et Mme Rey sa fille
- 1816, Portrait de Zélia, à 18 ans
- 1817, Portrait en pied d'un enfant de 4 ans
- 1817. Portrait de feu M. Collineau-Peltereau
- Portrait de M. Foubert
- Portrait de M. Happey
- Portrait de M. Dufour père
- Portrait de M. Coste
- Portrait de M. Champein
- Portrait de Mmes Julie et Rose de Frenays
- Portrait de Mme Duplantys
- Portrait de Mme Laugier
- Portrait de M. Viette

== Sources ==
- Froissart, Jean-Luc (2012). Alexandre, Albert et Angéline Lenoir: Une dynastie en A majeur (1761–1891) (in French). Paris: J.-L. Froissart. ISBN 978-2-9522836-3-2. (in French)
- Hérissant Le Doux, Explication des ouvrages de peinture, sculpture, architecture, gravure, exposés au Musée royal des arts, le 24 avril 1817. Paris : Impr. de Madame Hérissant Le Doux, imprimeur ordinaire du roi et des Musées royaux, 1817 (in French)
- Émile Bellier de La Chavignerie, 1882–1885, Dictionnaire général des artistes de l'École française depuis l'origine des arts du dessin jusqu'à nos jours : architectes, peintres, sculpteurs, graveurs et lithographes. Librairie Renouard (Paris) (in French)
