= Albert Lenoir =

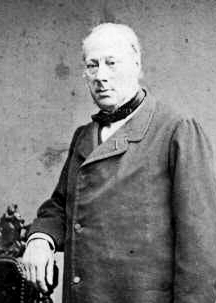
Albert Lenoir, by Charles Reutlinger (1860s)

Alexandre-Albert Lenoir (21 October 1801, Paris - 17 February 1891, Paris) was a French art historian, archaeologist, and writer; best known for creating what is now known as the Musée de Cluny.

== Biography ==
He was born to the archaeologist, Alexandre Lenoir, and his wife, the painter Adélaïde Binart. He studied at the Collège Henri IV then, in 1819, he took a position in the studios of François Debret, a well known architect. The following year, he was admitted to the École des Beaux-Arts, where he continued his architectural studies. In 1824, he took an extended trip througbh the Midi with some of his fellow students.

The years from 1830 to 1833 were spent in Italy with the architect, François-Alexis Cendrier. They travelled throughout the country, studying Greco-Roman and Etruscan architecture, as well as the early Christian basilicas. In 1831, he became a member of the new "Istituto di Corrispondenza Archeologica", founded by Eduard Gerhard, and published some of his work in their journal.

Upon returning to Paris, he made a presentation at the Salon: Projet d’un musée historique formé par la réunion du Palais des Thermes et de l’Hôtel de Cluny. His proposal was praised by the Inspector General of Historical Monuments, Ludovic Vitet. Two years later, he was named a member of the Comité des Arts et Monuments Historiques, established by François Guizot. That same year, he began work on his inventory of monuments, Statistique monumentale de Paris. He was also a lecturer in Byzantine architecture at the Bibliothèque Royale. In 1840, he was one of the founders of the Société Centrale des Architectes Français.

In 1841, he married Laure Rey (1822-1916). They had two daughters and a son, Alfred, who became a sculptor. Their eldest daughter, Zélia (1842-1919), was a painter. Their youngest, Angéline (1844-1877), was a poet.

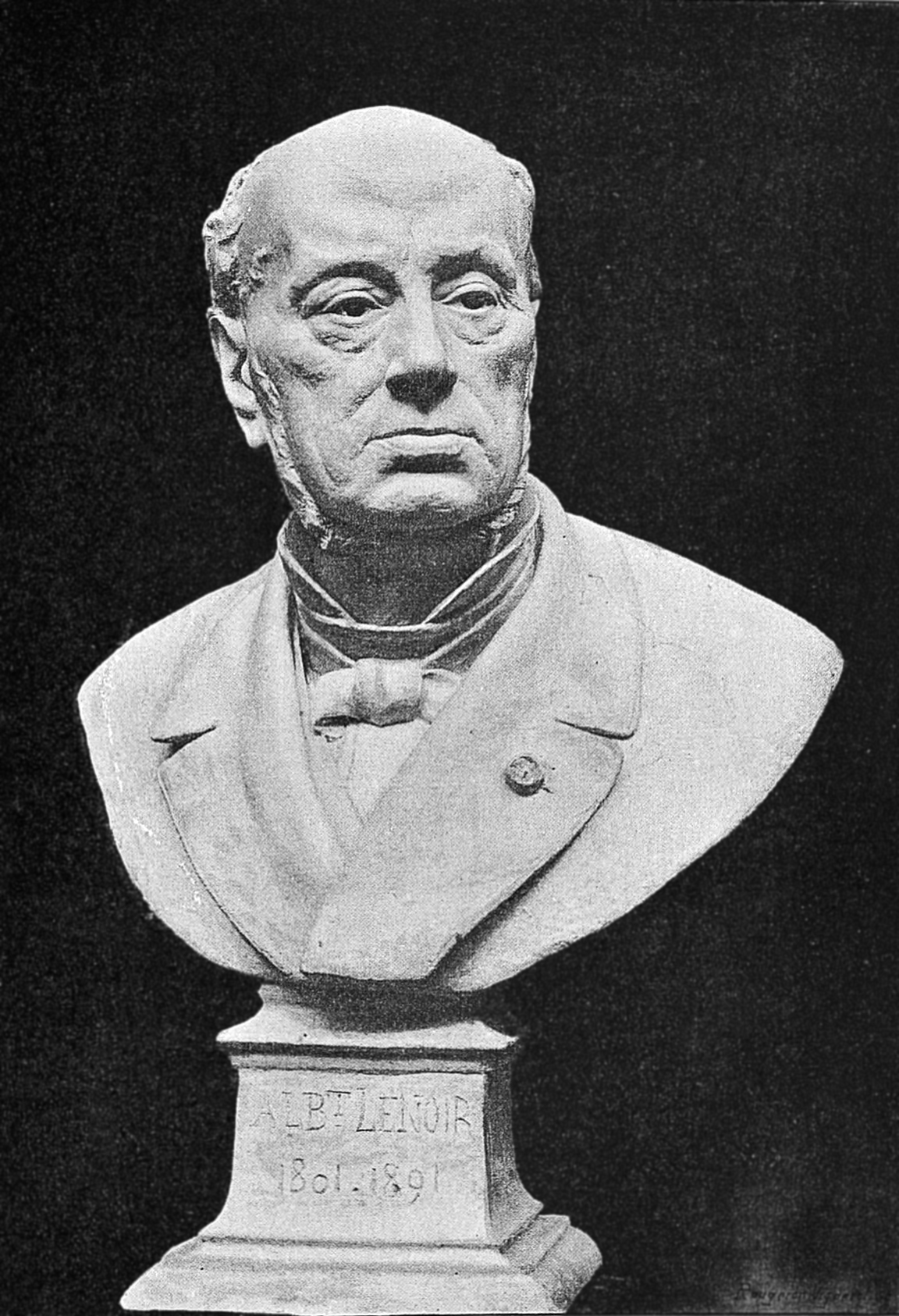
A bust of Lenoir by his son, Alfred (1891)

Ten years after his proposal at the Salon, he was appointed to oversee a project that would join the Palais des Thermes and the Hôtel de Cluny, to create a new establishment for housing the collection of medieval objects gathered by Alexandre Du Sommerard. Over 12,000 visitors came to the Musée du Moyen Âge within a short time after its inauguration. Partly in recognition of this work, he was named a Knight in the Legion of Honor in 1845.

From 1856, he taught at the École des Beaux-Arts. In 1862, he became the École's secretary. He was appointed to the Chair of Architecture in 1869. That same year, he was elected to the Académie des Beaux-Arts, where he took Seat #6 in the "Unattached" section, succeeding the Comte de Rambuteau (deceased). He also served on the jury at the Salon.

He retired from teaching in 1884, but soon accepted an offer to become the first President of the newly established Société des Amis des Monuments Parisiens. He died at the age of eighty-nine, and was interred at the Cimetière de Montparnasse.
