= Jadwiga Łuszczewska =

Polish poet and novelist (1834–1908)

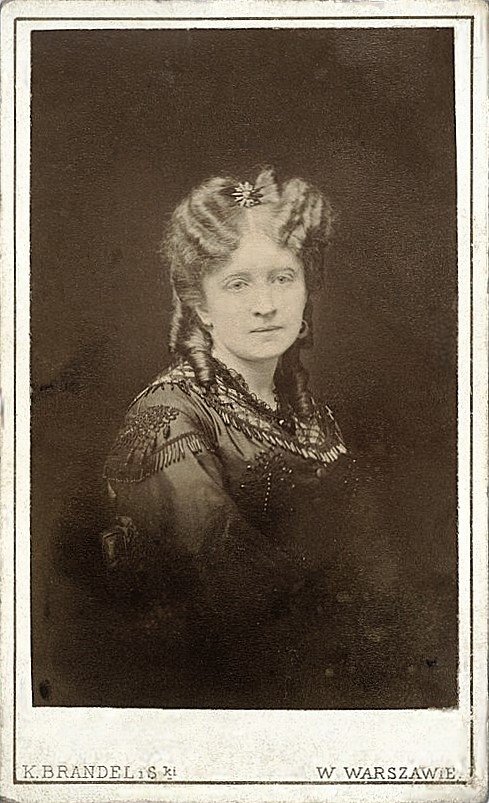
Jadwiga Łuszczewska

Jadwiga Łuszczewska (pen name: Deotyma (Diotima); 1 July 1834 – 23 September 1908) was a Polish poet, novelist and salonniére. She was born and died in Warsaw.

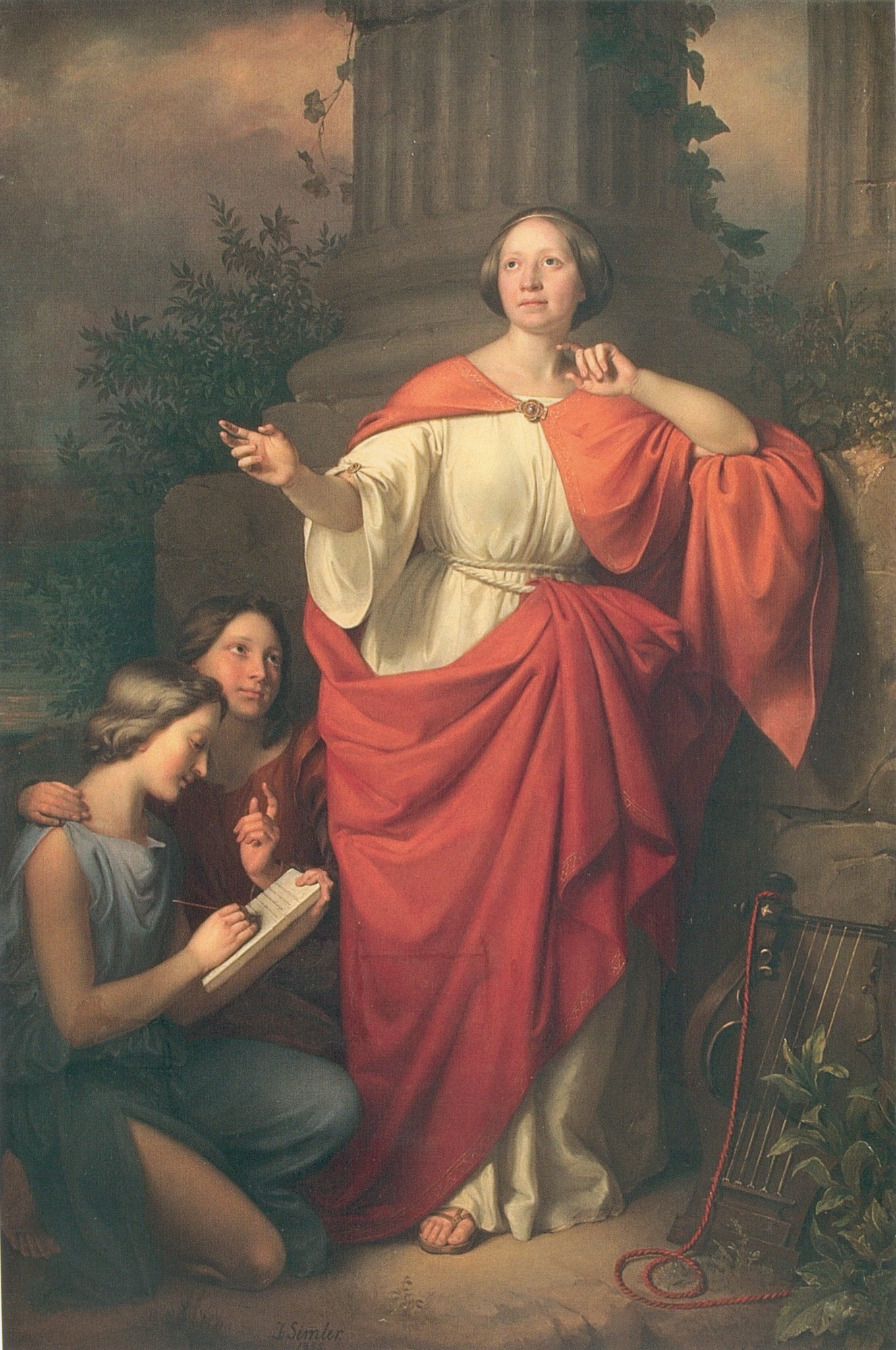
Łuszczewska posing as the ancient seer Diotima of Mantinea in a painting by Józef Simmler, 1855

== Works ==
- Lech (1859)
- Branki w jasyrze (1889)
- Panienka z okienka (1898)
- Sobieski pod Wiedniem (1908)
- Pamiętnik 1834-1897 (1968)
