= Lysicles (general, died 428 BC) =

Athenian politician and general (died 428 BC)

Lysicles (Ancient Greek: Λυσικλῆς Lysikles; died 428 BC) was an Athenian general and leader of the democratic faction in the city. He lived during the fifth century BC and possibly was a friend of Pericles.

According to Aeschines Socraticus, Lysicles lived with Aspasia after Pericles's death and had a son with her. Aeschines Socraticus is said to have credited Aspasia with all of Lysicles's political success. During the Peloponnesian War Lysicles was one of the "hawks"; he was convinced that the war against Sparta, which could not conceal its envy of Athens' pre-eminence, was inevitable if not to be welcomed. Aristophanes taunts him and calls him a "dealer in sheep".

Lysicles was killed in action in 428 BC. The Athenians sent out twelve ships to levy subsidies from their allies, with Lysicles and four others in command. After cruising to different places and laying them under contribution, Lysicles went up the country across the plain of Meander, in Caria. Being attacked by the Carians, he was slain with many of his soldiers.
