= Bertrand Andrieu =

French engraver

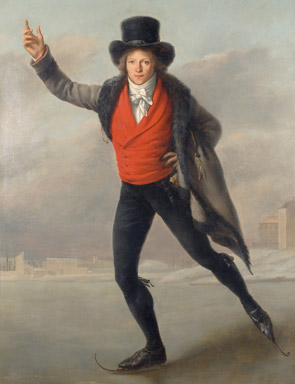
Andrieu as a skater painted by Pierre-Maximilien Delafontaine, 1798

Bertrand Andrieu (24 November 1761 – 6 December 1822) was a French engraver of medals. He was born in Bordeaux. In France, he was considered as the restorer of the art, which had declined after the time of Louis XIV. During the last twenty years of his life, the French government commissioned him to undertake every major work of importance.

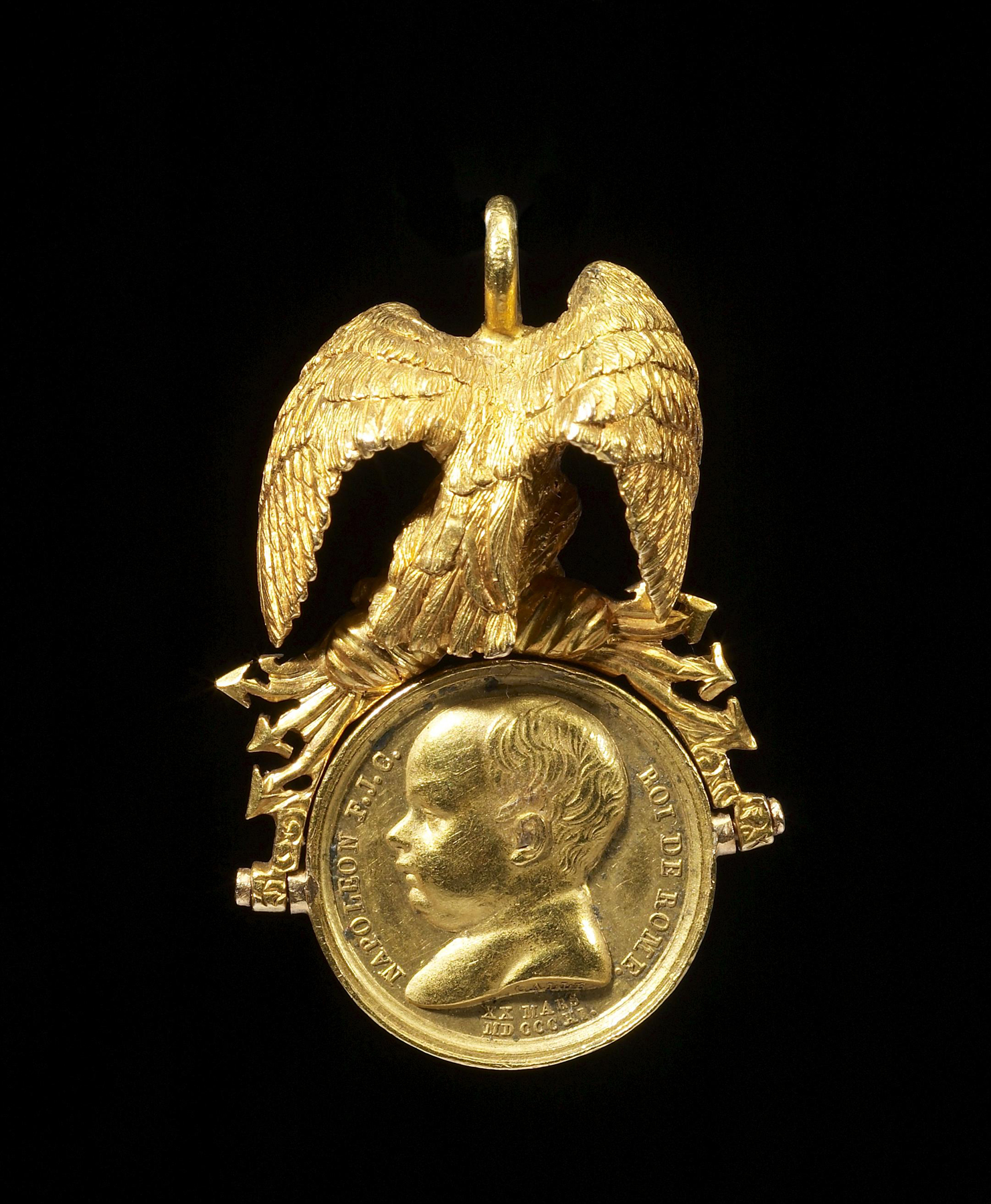
Bertrand Andrieu, Decoration Commemorating the Birth of the "King of Rome", 1811

== Sources ==
- "Bertrand Andrieu" . Encyclopædia Britannica. Vol. II (9th ed.). New York: Charles Scribner's Sons. 1878.
