= Musée des Monuments français (1795–1816) =

Coordinates: 48.8576°N 2.3345°E

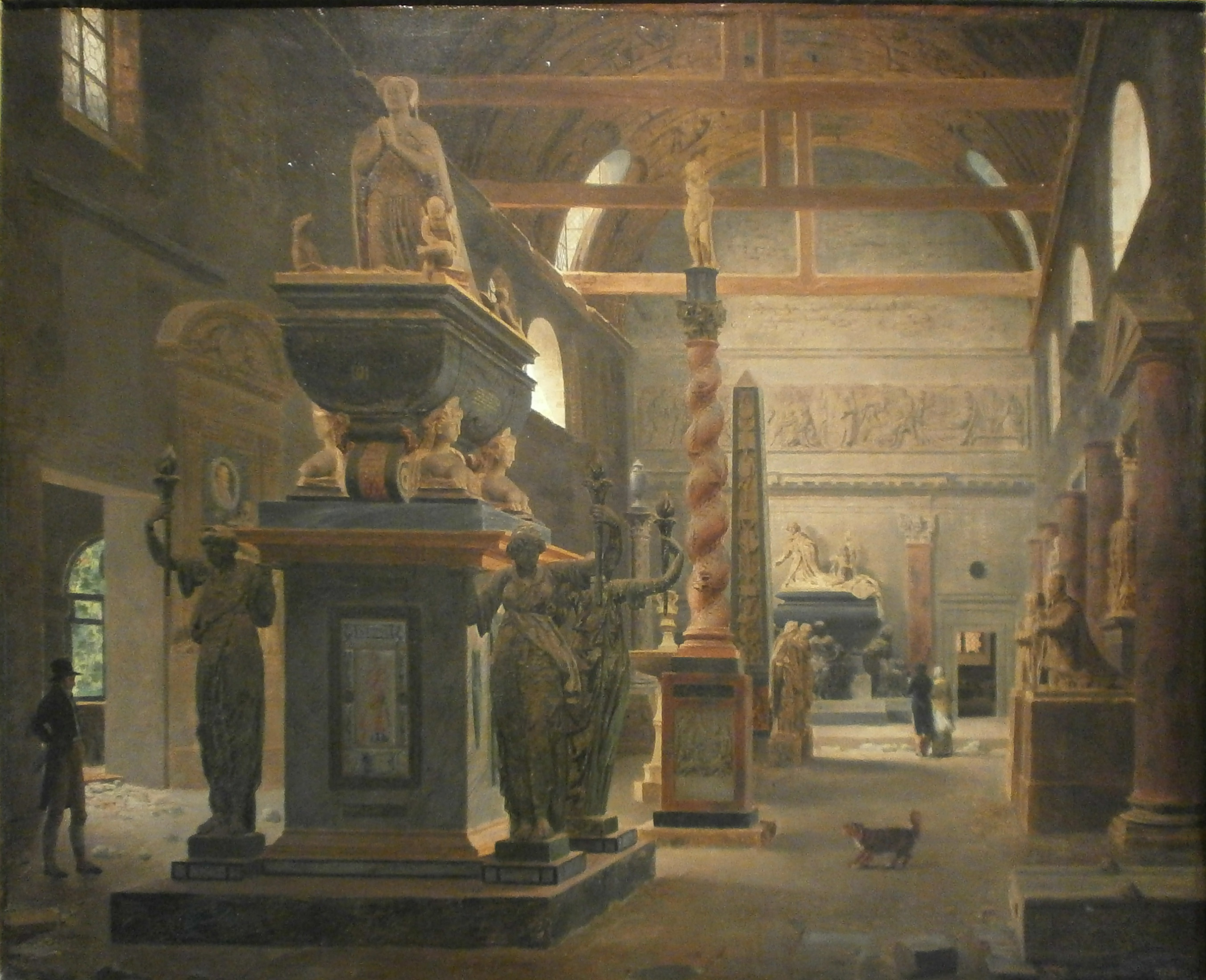
The chapel of the Petits-Augustins repurposed as part of the Musée des Monuments Français in 1804, by Jean-Lubin Vauzelle

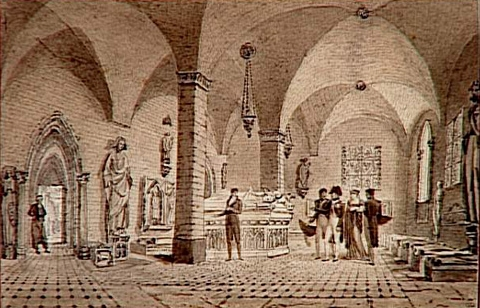
Napoleon and Joséphine visit the museum with Alexandre Lenoir, by Jean-Baptiste Réville

The Musée des Monuments français (French pronunciation: [myze de mɔnymɑ̃ fʁɑ̃sɛ]) was a French art museum, created in 1795 on the initiative of Alexandre Lenoir. It displayed sculptures and other objects, many salvaged on Lenoir's own initiative from the destructions of the French Revolution. It was established in the former convent of the Petits-Augustins on the left bank of the Seine in Paris, now part of the campus of the Beaux-Arts de Paris.

== History ==
Following the nationalization of religious properties on 2 November 1789, the revolutionary government's Monuments Commission in late 1790 created a depository of cultural artefacts in the just-disestablished Augustinian convent of the Petits-Augustins. The following year, it appointed Lenoir, then a young painter, to administer the facility.

As revolutionary destructions accelerated, Lenoir gathered an increased number of sculptures and other objects into the deposit, including most of the decoration of the royal tombs in the Basilica of Saint-Denis following the National Convention's decision on 1 August 1793 to destroy these icons of the former monarchy. He also collected mortal remains from the desecrated burials of monarchs in Saint-Denis (Hugh Capet, Philip IV, Charles V, Charles VI, Louis XII, Catherine de' Medici) and of other historical figures (Abelard and Héloïse, the Cardinal de Retz, Molière, La Fontaine, Boileau, Mabillon). On 21 October 1795, he was authorized to open the deposit as a museum, the second in France after the Louvre had opened in 1793.

In 1816, following the Bourbon Restoration, the new royal government closed Lenoir's museum. Many of the objects were re-installed in the churches from which they had been transferred, including the royal burial monuments in Saint-Denis. Others were taken over by the Louvre, where they are part of what is now the Département des Sculptures; by the Musée de l'Histoire de France in the Palace of Versailles, opened in 1837; and by the Musée de Cluny, opened in 1843. The royal remains collected by Lenoir were reinterred in Saint-Denis, and those of non-royals at the Père Lachaise Cemetery.

== See also ==
- Musée national des Monuments Français
- Trocadéro Palace
