= Armand D'Angour =

British classical scholar and musician (born 1958)

- Born: 23 November 1958 (age 67); London

Academic background
- Thesis: The dynamics of innovation: newness and novelty in the Athens of Aristophanes (1998)
- Doctoral advisor: Peter Lunt; Richard Janko; Alan Griffiths

Academic work
- Institutions: Jesus College, Oxford
- Doctoral students: Laura Swift
- Website: www.armand-dangour.com

Armand D'Angour (born 23 November 1958) is a British classical scholar and classical musician, Professor of Classics at Oxford University and Fellow and Tutor in Classics at Jesus College, Oxford. His research embraces a wide range of areas across ancient Greek culture, and has resulted in publications that contribute to scholarship on ancient Greek music and metre, innovation in ancient Greece, Latin and Greek lyric poetry, the biography of Socrates and the status of Aspasia of Miletus. He writes poetry in ancient Greek and Latin, and was commissioned to compose odes in ancient Greek verse for the 2004 and 2012 Olympic Games.

D'Angour has conducted research into the sounds of ancient Greek music (since 2013), aiming to recreate the sound of the earliest substantial notated document of Greek music (from Euripides' drama Orestes), and to establish connections with much later Western musical traditions.

D'Angour's book Socrates in Love (2019) presents new evidence for a radically revisionist historical thesis regarding the role of Aspasia of Miletus in the development of Socrates' thought. How to Innovate: An Ancient Guide to Creative Thinking (2021) distils for the general reader some of the findings relating to innovation explored in his academic monograph The Greeks and the New: Novelty in Ancient Greek Imagination and Experience (Cambridge 2011).

== Early life ==
D'Angour was born in London, England, and was educated at Sussex House School and as a King's Scholar at Eton College. While at Eton, he won the Newcastle Scholarship in 1976 (the last year in which the original twelve exams in Classics and Divinity were set), and was awarded a Postmastership (full academic scholarship) to Merton College, Oxford to read classics.

Having learned to play the piano from the age of six and the cello from the age of 11, from 1976 to 1979 D'Angour undertook a Performer's Course, with piano and cello as joint first instruments, at the Royal College of Music, London, where he studied piano with Angus Morrison and cello with Anna Shuttleworth and Joan Dickson.

D'Angour went on to read classics at Oxford (1979–83), during which he won the Gaisford Greek Prose Prize, the Chancellor's Latin Verse Prize, the Hertford Scholarship, and the Ireland and Craven Scholarship, and graduated with a Double First (BA Hons, Literae Humaniores).

In 1981-2 he conducted the Kodály Choir and orchestra, with performances including Brahms' 1st Piano Concerto (with Colin Stone, piano), Poulenc's Organ Concerto (with Michael Emery, organ) and Fauré's Requiem (with Rudolf Piernay, baritone). In 1983, he sat for a Prize Fellowship by Examination at All Souls College, but was unsuccessful. He then studied cello in the Netherlands with cellist Anner Bylsma, and now regularly performs as cellist with the London Brahms Trio.

From 1987 to 1994 D'Angour worked in and eventually managed a family business. In 1994-8 he researched for a PhD at University College London on the dynamics of innovation in ancient Athens, a topic inspired by both his classical background and his experience of innovation in business. During this period he co-authored a book with Steven Shaw on swimming in relation to the principles of the Alexander Technique.

== Academic career ==
In the course of his doctoral research, D'Angour published his first scholarly article (in Classical Quarterly 1997) "How the Dithyramb Got Its Shape", in which he restored the opening lines of a fragment of Pindar (fr. 70b from Dithyramb 2, first published in 1919) to show that it refers to the creation of the 'circular dance' (kuklios choros), the form in which the dithyramb was performed in Athens in the early fifth century BC. The article contributed to a renewed interest in the ancient genre of the dithyramb, and has featured in numerous articles and books (including Dithyramb in Context, ed. B. Kowalzig and P. Wilson, Oxford 2013) that explore the subject from different angles. He also published an article (1999) detailing the technical and political background to the adoption of the Ionic alphabet (still the standard Greek script) by a decree of Eucleides in Athens in 403 BC.

In 2000, D'Angour was appointed Fellow in Classics at Jesus College, Oxford. He extended the chronological scope of this doctoral research to produce The Greeks and the New (published by Cambridge University Press in 2011), a wide-ranging academic study of novelty and innovation in ancient Greece; he has applied the findings of his research to business and to other domains, including music and psychoanalytic theory. His TedED lessons on Archimedes' Eureka Moment and the Origins of the Ancient Olympics have attracted millions of views.

In March 2019, he published Socrates in Love: The Making of a Philosopher, in which he presents new evidence for the identification of Diotima in Plato's Symposium with Aspasia of Miletus.

D'Angour became Professor of Classics in 2020 Oxford Recognition of Distinction. His book How to Innovate: an Ancient Guide to Creative Thinking(Princeton, 2021) summarises some of the ideas that were presented in The Greeks and the New, and offers a four-part template for understanding how innovation comes about and how it might be fostered.

In August 2024, D'Angour began hosting the podcast series It's All Greek (and Latin) to Me with comedian and television presenter Jimmy Mulville for Hat Trick Productions. The series "aims to shine a light on the ancient world through expressions, stories and quotes from Classical literature that we use in our everyday lives".

== Ancient Greek music ==
In 2013–15, D'Angour conducted a Research Fellowship awarded by the British Academy to investigate the way music interacted with poetic texts in ancient Greece. In 2013 he published a conjectural verse reconstruction of the lost portion of Sappho's famous fragment 31.

In May 2015 D'Angour appeared in a BBC Four documentary entitled 'Sappho', for which he used scholarly evidence to recompose the music for two stanzas of an ancient Sapphic song; in July 2016 he organised and presented a research-driven concert of ancient music in the Nereids Gallery of the British Museum. In January 2017 he was interviewed about his research into ancient Greek music by Labis Tsirigotakis as part of the programme 'To the Sound of Big Ben' on Greek TV's ERT1 Channel; and in July 2017 the first public performance of his musical reconstructions of the chorus preserved on papyrus from Euripides Orestes (408 BC) and the Delphic Paean of Athenaeus (127 BC) was given at the Ashmolean Museum, Oxford.

D'Angour has argued for the affective symbolism and tonal basis of Greek music of the Classical period, and for its connection to much later European musical traditions. His numerous public talks, media interviews, and online presentations on the topic led to the award in 2017 by the Vice-Chancellor of Oxford University Louise Richardson of a prize for public engagement with research. He subsequently composed music in ancient Greek style to accompany a series of performances of Euripides' play Alcestis (438 BC) staged in the Greek theatre at Bradfield College in June 2019, and his research has inspired other stage performances including that of Euripides' Herakles at Barnard College, Columbia in 2019.

== Greek and Latin compositions ==
At the request of Dame Mary Glen-Haig, senior member of the International Olympic Committee, D'Angour composed an Ode to Athens in 2004, in the appropriate Pindaric style, Doric dialect and metre (dactylo-epitrite) of ancient Greek, together with an English verse translation. The ode was recited at the 116th Closing Session of the IOC in 2004 and gained wide media coverage, including a full-page spread in the Times headed up by veteran journalist and classicist Philip Howard.

In 2010 Boris Johnson, then Mayor of London, commissioned D’Angour to write an ode in English and Ancient Greek for the London Olympics 2012, and declaimed it at the IOC Opening Gala. Johnson arranged for the 2012 ode to be engraved on a bronze plaque in the Queen Elizabeth Olympic Park, and gave a performance of it at the site during a ceremony (2 August 2012) attended by the Lord Mayor of London (Sir David Wootton) to mark the unveiling of the plaque.

On behalf of the Society for the Promotion of Hellenic Studies, D'Angour wrote a poem in Latin Sapphics in honour of the Society for the Promotion of Roman Studies for its 2010 centenary. Two compositions in Latin verse (elegiacs and Sapphics) celebrating the land of Luxembourg (Terra Ego Sum and Wou d' Uelzecht) were commissioned in 2020 and set to music by composer Catherine Kontz. They were part of a series of full-scale choral performances put on in France and Luxembourg in June 2022.

With his colleague Melinda Letts at Jesus College Oxford, D'Angour has pioneered since 2019 the revival of the use of teaching ancient languages in the original language (the "Active Method") at Oxford University. In April 2022 he was invited to deliver a talk in Latin entitled Musica linguae, Lingua Musicae ('The music of language, The language of music') at the Delphi Economic Forum, Greece, to demonstrate both the use of Active Latin and the enduring tradition of ancient Greek music. In July 2022 his impromptu translation into Latin Elegiac Verse of Philip Larkin's 'This Be The Verse' was cited in the Times Literary Supplement.

== Socrates and Aspasia ==
D'Angour's research into the early life of the philosopher Socrates led him to propose an argument for Plato's modelling (rather than identification, as had long been suggested by 18th and 19th century writers) of Diotima in Symposium on Aspasia of Miletus. His book on the subject, Socrates in Love, was reviewed in the Wall Street Journal in May 2019, with reviewer Jamie James writing:

It is a tour de force of scholarship, and D'Angour sifts through his vast reading with judicious care. Open-minded but not credulous, he accomplishes what was long thought to be impossible: a reliable, consistent account of the man who forged the matrix of Western philosophy [...] D'Angour rehabilitates Aspasia's reputation and ingeniously argues that she originated the concept of Platonic love, one of the first principles of Western philosophy. Moreover, he moots the "attractive and compelling possibility that the advent of Aspasia into the young Socrates' life" may present "an appealing and credible image of Socrates in love".

Reviews also appeared in The Times (by Patrick Kidd), The Telegraph (by Nikhil Krishnan), The Financial Times (by Peter Stothard), and numerous other journals. In a detailed review published in 2021 in Ancient Philosophy, philosopher David Hoinski accepts D'Angour's contention that the contribution of women such as Aspasia to ancient philosophy has received too little attention by modern scholars.

Tim Whitmarsh, reviewing Socrates in Love in The Guardian, commends D'Angour's application of prosopographical methods to the Athenian male elite, but avoids addressing the arguments made for the Socrates–Aspasia relationship. David Sansone in Bryn Mawr Classical Review comments that the book "presents us with an intriguing alternative to the usual view of the real Socrates” rather than the standard ones that neglect the reality of Socrates having once been young.

Whitmarsh early on observes in his review that "This is a learned, agile and slickly written book, but it is not without its problems"; he concludes that the portrayal of Socrates and Aspasia in it is a "donnish just-so story ... best left to the Victorians." Sansone is even more cutting: "it is necessary to ensure that all the evidence be presented accurately and evaluated with care. It cannot be said that D’Angour has succeeded in doing this."

== Publications ==
Books

- The Greeks and the New: Novelty in Greek imagination and experience (Cambridge, 2011).
- Music, Text, and Culture in Ancient Greece, co-edited with Tom Phillips (Oxford, 2018).
- Socrates in Love: The Making of a Philosopher (Bloomsbury, 2019).
- How to Innovate: An Ancient Guide to Creative Thinking (Princeton, 2021).

Selected academic articles

- "How the Dithyramb Got its Shape", Classical Quarterly 47 (1997), 331–351.
- "Ad unguem", American Journal of Philology vol.120, no. 3 (1999), 411–427.
- "Archinus, Eucleides, and the reform of the Athenian alphabet", Bulletin of the Institute of Classical Studies 43 (1999), 109–130.
- "Catullus 107: a Callimachean reading", Classical Quarterly 50 (2000), 615–618.
- "Drowning by Numbers: Pythagoreanism & Poetry in Horace Odes 1.28", Greece and Rome 50 (2003), 206–219.
- "Conquering Love: Sappho 31 and Catullus 51", Classical Quarterly 56 (2006), 297–300.
- "Horace's Victory Odes", in Receiving the Komos: Ancient and modern receptions of the Victory Ode, eds. P. Agocs et al. (London 2012), 57–72.
- "Plato and Play: Taking education seriously in ancient Greece", American Journal of Play Vol. 5, no. 3 (Spring 2013), 293–307.
- "Sense and Sensation in music", in A Companion to Ancient Aesthetics, ed. Paul Destrée and Penelope Murray (Wiley-Blackwell: New Jersey, 2014), 188–203.
- "Vocables and microtones in ancient Greek music", in Greek and Roman Musical Studies 4.2 (2016), 273–285.
- "Euripides and the sound of music", in A Companion to Euripides, ed. L. McClure (John Wiley 2017), 428–443.
- "The musical setting of ancient Greek texts", in Music, Texts, and Culture in ancient Greece, co-edited with T. Phillips (OUP, 2018)
- "Translating Catullus 85: Why and How". Philologia Classica 14.1 (2019), 155–60.
- "The Musical Frogs in Frogs". In Ancient Greek Comedy, eds. A. Fries and D. Kanellakis. (De Gruyter 2020), 187–198.
- "Recreating the Music of Euripides' Orestes". Greek and Roman Musical Studies 9.1 (2021), 175–190.
