= Józef Simmler =

Polish painter (1823–1868)

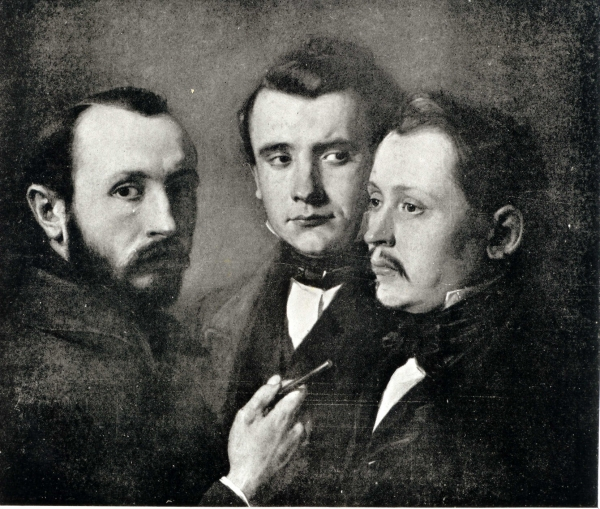
Portrait of Józef Simmler (left) and his brothers (c. 1850)

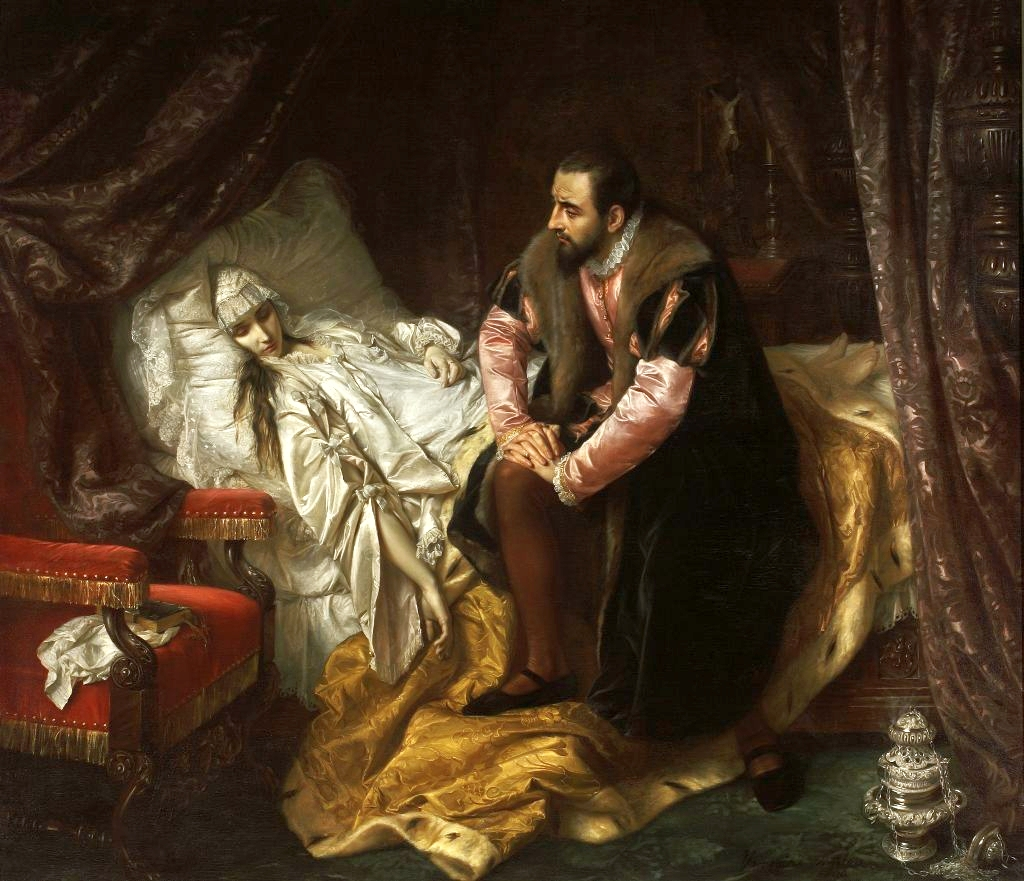
Death of Barbara Radziwillowna (1860)

Józef Simmler (March 14, 1823, in Warsaw – March 1, 1868, in Warsaw) was a Polish painter known for his classical style and his Polish subjects.

== Biography ==
Simmler came from a wealthy German Protestant family. It was this affluent upbringing that allowed him to pursue his interest in cities like Dresden, Munich and Paris.

Perhaps his most famous work is "Death of Barbara Radziwillowna" ("Śmierć Barbary Radziwiłłówny"), an oil on canvas work completed in 1860. The painting gained immense popularity when the Warsaw-based Society for the Promotion of the Fine Arts, a newly formed institution with the goal of encouraging and promoting domestic art and artists, put it on exhibit in 1861. It now hangs in the National Museum, Warsaw. His other famous paintings are "Children of King Edward" (1847) and "Portrait of a Nobleman with a Parrot" (1859).

Józef Simmler's major contribution to Polish art is the humaneness that his paintings evoked. He was a specially gifted portraitist. Using styles of costume paintings prevalent in France, he produced works that allowed the public a view of the past. His paintings, however, were more than just reproductions of history. The masterful works also gave a deep sense of compassion, dread, and tenderness.

He was buried at the Evangelical Reformed Cemetery in Warsaw.

His daughter's brother-in-law was Eduard Strasburger, Polish-German botanist. One of Simmler's grandsons was Henryk Leon Strasburger, a Polish delegate to the League of Nations.

== Selected paintings ==
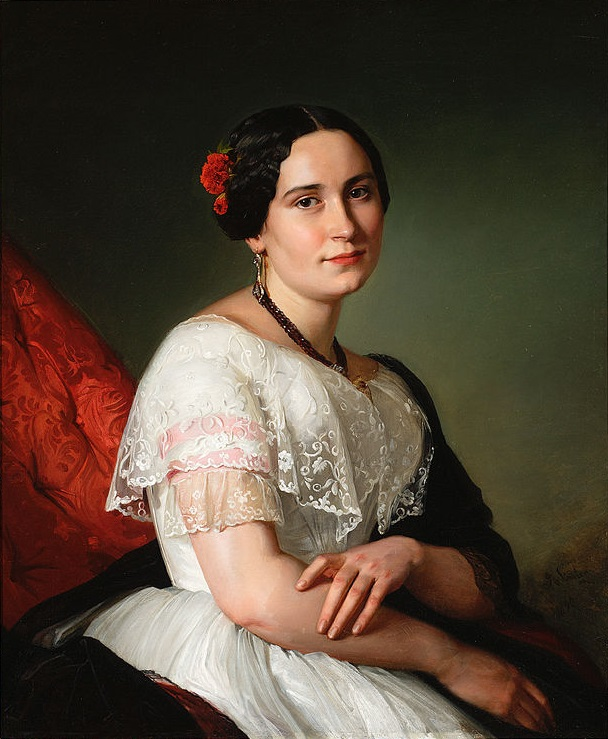
His sister, Katarzyna Jahn (1849)

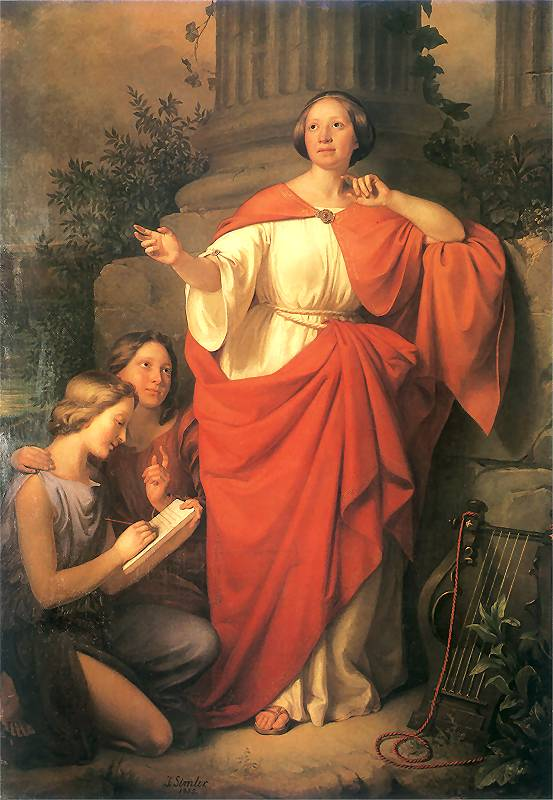
Jadwiga Łuszczewska (1855)

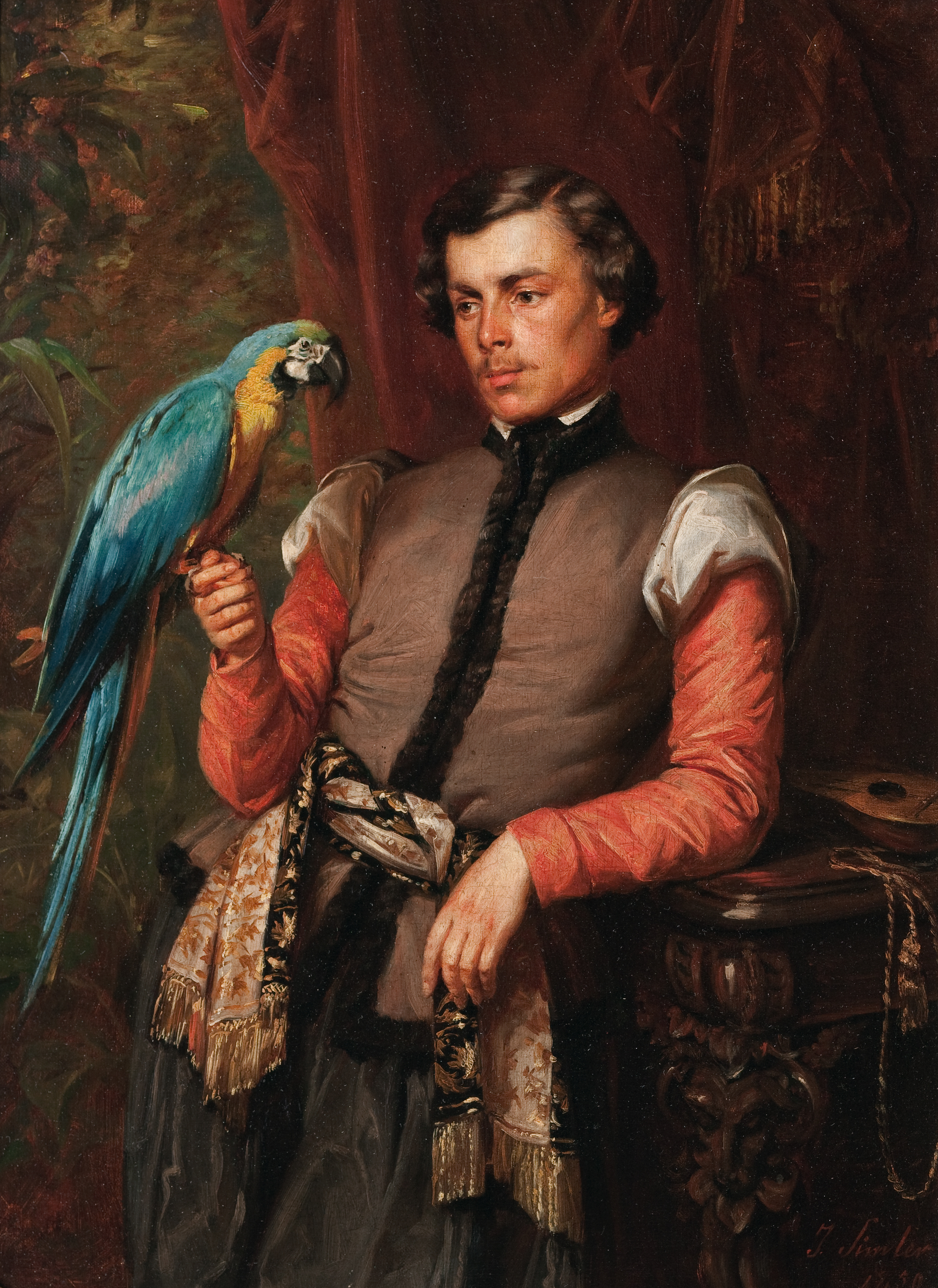
Nobleman with a parrot (1859)

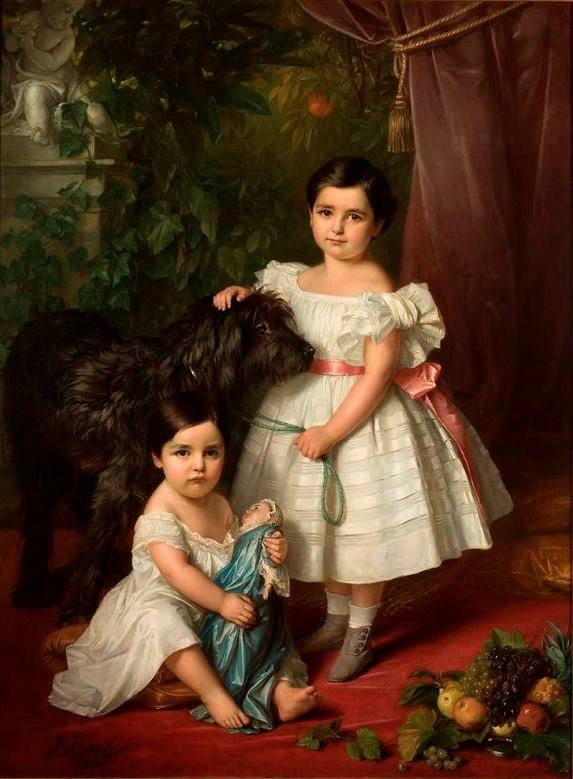
The Kronenberg sisters (1860)
