= Callias (poet) =

5th-century BC Athenian poet of Old Comedy

Callias (Ancient Greek: Καλλίας), sometimes called by the nickname Schoenion (Σχοινίων), was a poet of the Old Comedy.

Callias is best known for a few extant fragments of a comedy, The Letter Tragedy. This comedy featured a 24-piece chorus that consisted of the 24 letters of the Greek alphabet. It is the earliest attestation of most of the letter names in the Greek alphabet. On this work there has been debate since the early 19th century over the meaning of the play's claim to have influenced Greek tragedy. Many scholars take Callias' claim to have been ironic and a joke. The titles of his other known plays are: Aigyptios (The Egyptian), Atalante, Batrakhoi (Frogs), Kyklopes (The Cyclopes), Pedetai (Men In Shackles), Scholazontes (Men At Leisure), and a fragmentary title ...era Sidera, which has been reconstructed as either Hypera Sidera (Iron Pestles) or Entera Sidera (Iron Guts).

Callias appears to have been given the teasing nickname Schoinion by his rivals, probably because his father was a rope maker. It is also recorded that he lampooned the philosopher Socrates.
