= Alexandre Lenoir =

French archaeologist

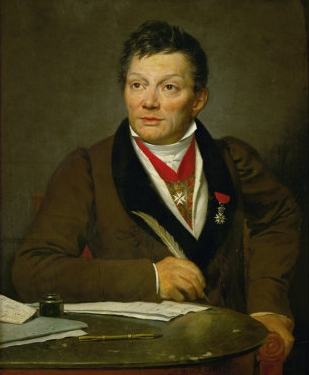
- Portrait by Jacques-Louis David (1815–1817)
- Born: Marie Alexandre Lenoir; 27 December 1761; Paris, France
- Died: 11 June 1839 (aged 77); Paris, France
- Occupation: archaeologist

Marie Alexandre Lenoir (French pronunciation: [maʁi alɛksɑ̃dʁ lənwaʁ]; 27 December 1761 – 11 June 1839) was a French archaeologist. Self-taught, he devoted himself to saving France's historic monuments, sculptures and tombs from the ravages of the French Revolution, notably those of Saint-Denis and Sainte-Geneviève.

== Life ==
The ravages of the Revolution caused the birth of the Musée des monuments français. Thanks to support from Jean Sylvain Bailly, Alexandre Lenoir successfully demanded that all art objects from state properties be gathered together in this museum. These objects were confiscated at different religious houses and stored in a single place to avoid their dispersal and destruction.

Mandated by the National Constituent Assembly in 1791, he brought together the various objects he sought to conserve in the Couvent des Petits Augustins, a building which later was converted to become the École nationale supérieure des Beaux-Arts.

On 1 August 1793, the National Convention decreed that the tombs of "former kings" should be destroyed. Alexandre Lenoir witnessed the destruction of the royal tombs, with the bones thrown into a ditch. He struggled against revolutionary vandalism and managed to save statues and loot which he stored at the couvent des Petits-Augustins.

In 1795, he opened the Musée des monuments français to the public — he was its administrator for 30 years.

In October 1796, Lenoir was among a number of artists who signed a petition supporting plans to seize works of art from Rome, in response to an early artists' petition orchestrated by Quatremère de Quincy that remonstrated against these plans.

In 1816, under the Bourbon Restoration, he had to return the majority of his collections to their former public and private owners.

His wife, Adélaïde Binart (1771–1832), exhibited at the Salons under the name Adélaïde Lenoir.

Lenoir died on 11 June 1839 and is buried in Montparnasse Cemetery.

== Portraits ==
- By Marie-Geneviève Bouliard, exhibited at the 1796 salon, bought by the musée Carnavalet in 1899
- By Pierre-Maximilien Delafontaine, dated 1799, given by Alexandre's grandson Alfred Lenoir to the musée national du château de Versailles
- By Jacques-Louis David - begun in France and completed in 1817 in Brussels, acquired in 1921 by the Louvre

== Gallery ==
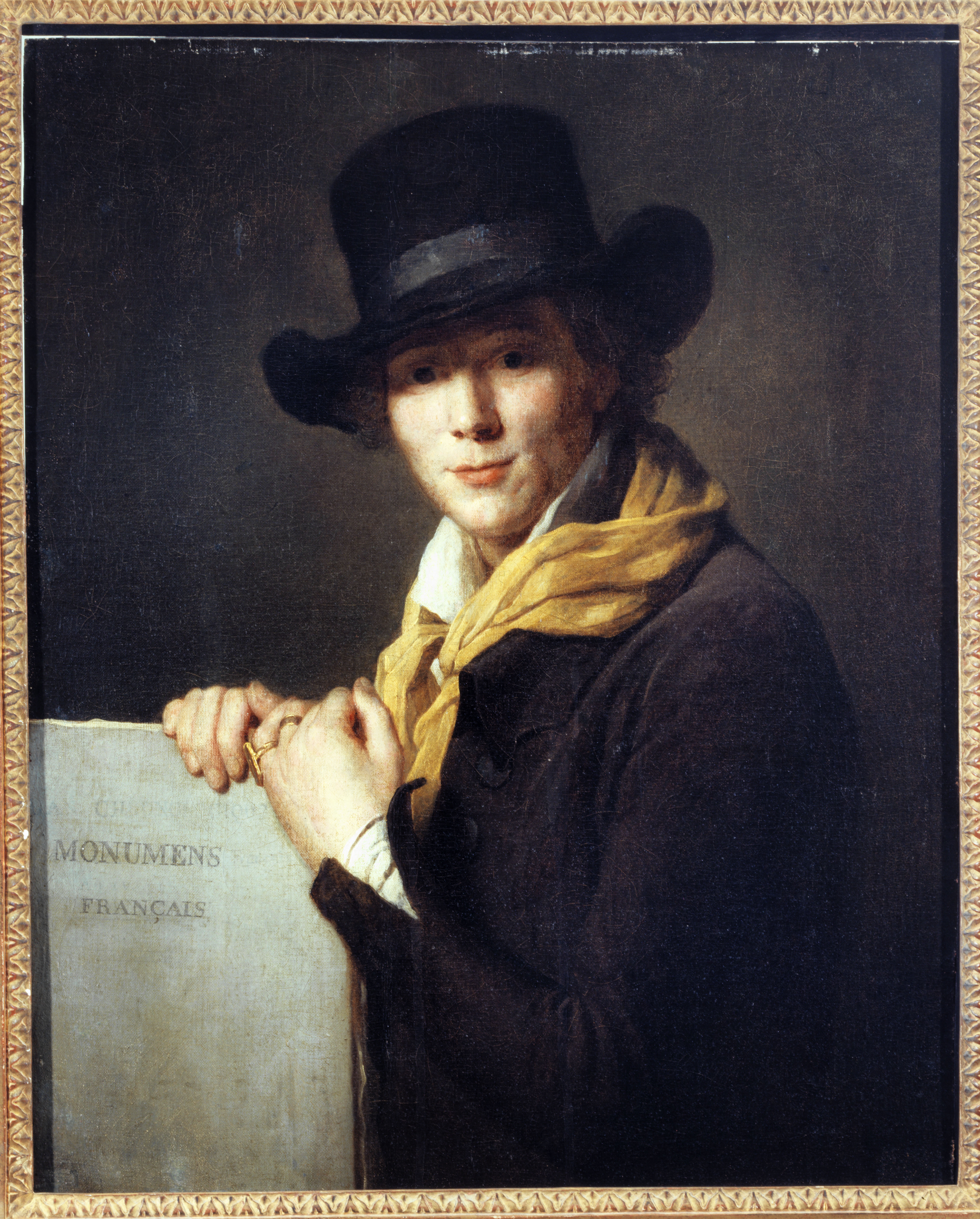
Alexandre Lenoir by Marie-Geneviève Bouliard
1796.

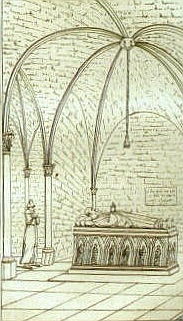
View of the tomb of Abelard at Saint-Marcel near Chalon-sur-Saône.
Engraving after a drawing by Alexandre Lenoir.

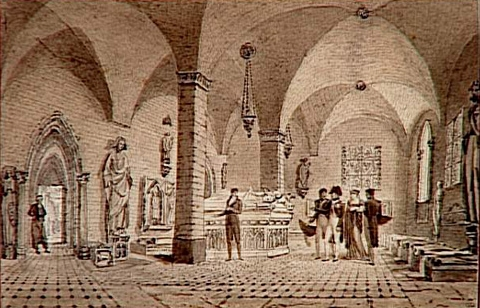
Napoleon and Joséphine visiting the Musée des monuments français with Alexandre Lenoir.

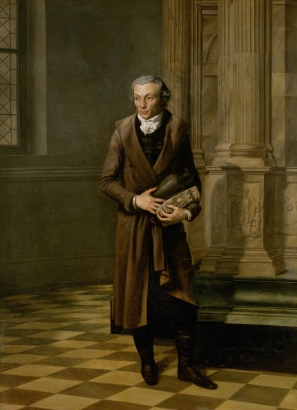
Alexandre Lenoir by Pierre-Maximilien Delafontaine.
Alexandre Lenoir holding the urn containing the ashes of Molière in front of the tomb of Francis I of France on show at the Musée.

== Bibliography ==
- Bresc-Bautier, Geneviève; Chancel-Bardelot, Béatrice de, eds. (2016). Un musée révolutionaire: le musée des Monuments français d'Alexandre Lenoir. Paris: Louvre éditions. ISBN 978-2-75410-937-6.
- Louis Courajod, Alexandre Lenoir, son journal et le Musée des monuments français, H. Champion, Paris, 3 vol., 1878–1887
- Froissart, Jean-Luc (2012), Alexandre, Albert et Angéline Lenoir: Une dynastie en A majeur (1761–1891) (in French), Paris: J.-L. Froissart, ISBN 978-2-9522836-3-2
- Stara, Alexandra (2013). The Museum of French Monuments 1795–1816: "Killing art to make history". Farnham: Ashgate. ISBN 978-1-4094-3799-4.

== Sources ==
- (in French) Jean Tulard, Jean-François Fayard and Alfred Fierro, Histoire et dictionnaire de la Révolution française. 1789–1799, Robert Laffont, Bouquins collection, Paris, 1987 (ISBN 270282076X)
