= Marie Bouliard =

French artist (1763–1825)

Marie-Geneviève Bouliard
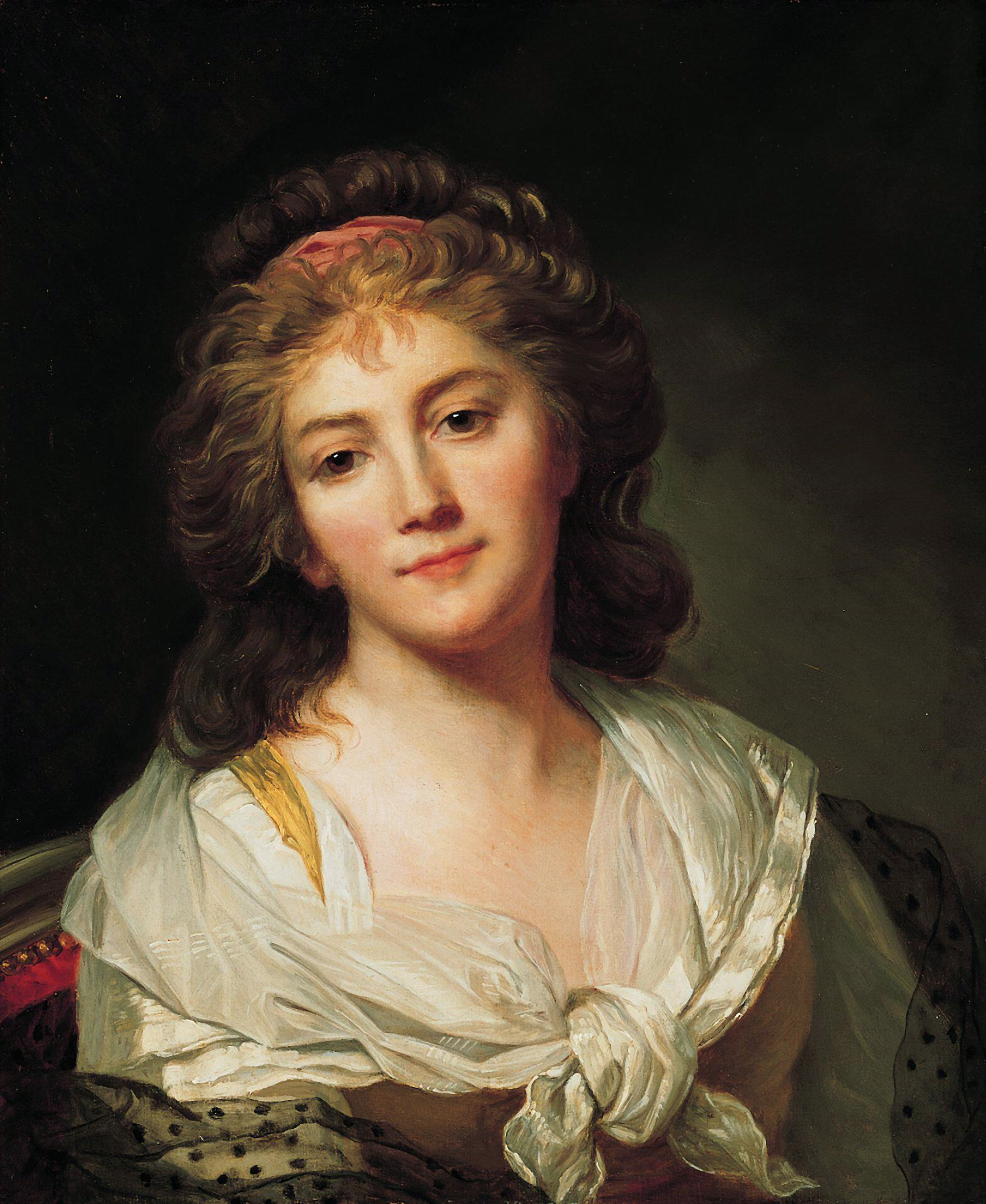
- Marie-Geneviève Bouliard, Self-portrait (1792), Pasadena, Norton Simon Museum.
- Born: 1763; Paris, France
- Died: 9 October 1825 (aged 61–62); Bois-d'Arcy, France
- Known for: Painting

Marie-Geneviève Bouliard (1763–1825) was a French artist who primarily painted portraits.

She was born in Paris. She was a pupil of Jean-Baptiste Greuze, Joseph-Benoît Suvée, and Joseph Duplessis. In 1791, Bouliard made her debut at the Paris Salon with her painting Woman's Head Crowned with Roses. Her Aspasia, a self-portrait, was produced in 1794. It was exhibited in the 1795 Paris Salon where it received a Prix d'Encouragement.

In 1808 she exhibited Head of a Woman. Her painting Portrait of an Actress, Probably Mlle. Bélier was included in the 1905 book Women Painters of the World.

Bouliard died in 1825 in Saône-et-Loire.

== Gallery ==
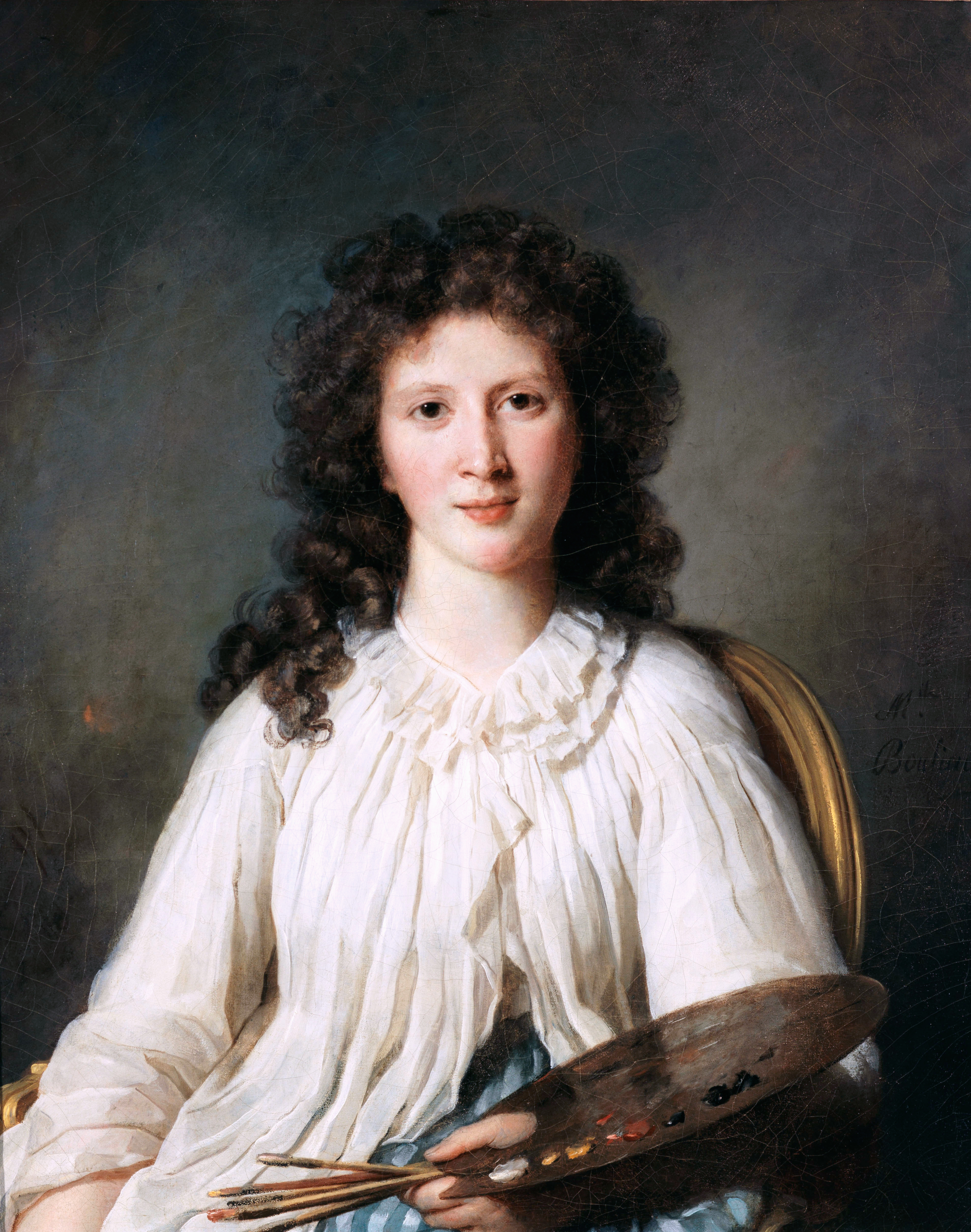
Portrait of Adélaïde Binart, épouse Lenoir

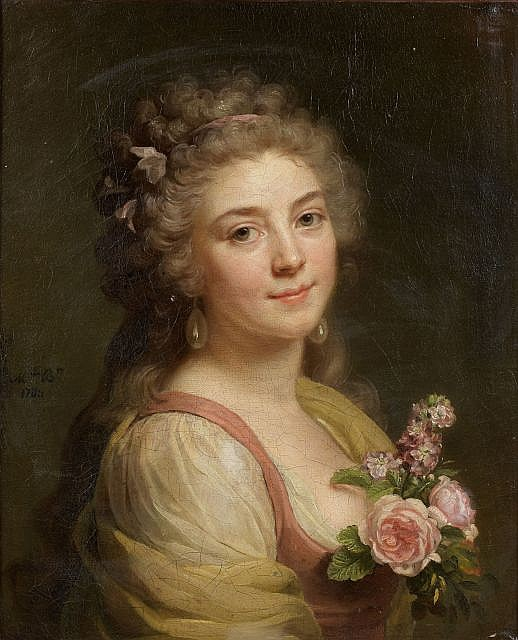
Portrait of an actress, or Mlle Bélier, published in Women Painters of the World, 1785

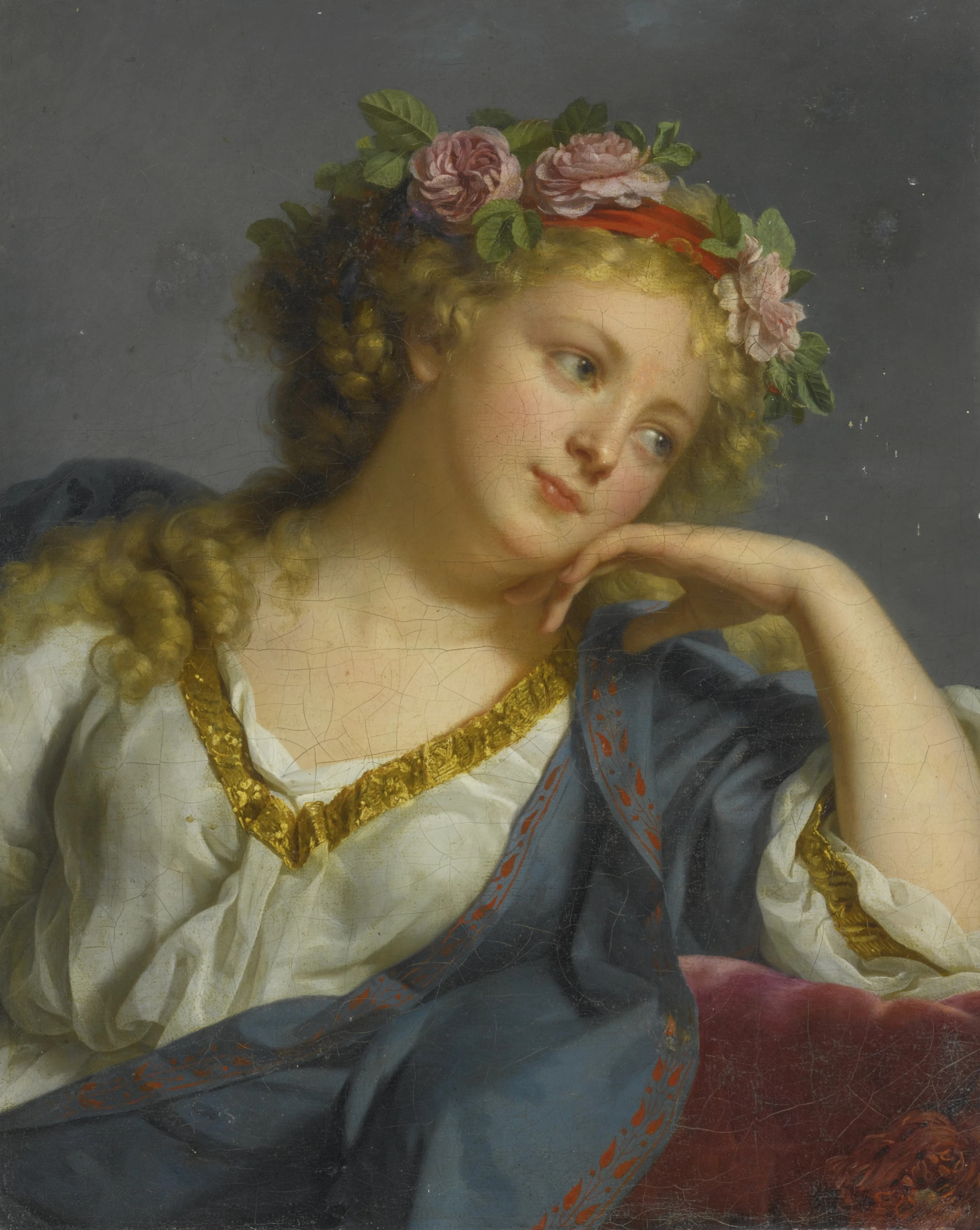
Bust of a Woman crowned with Roses, 1791

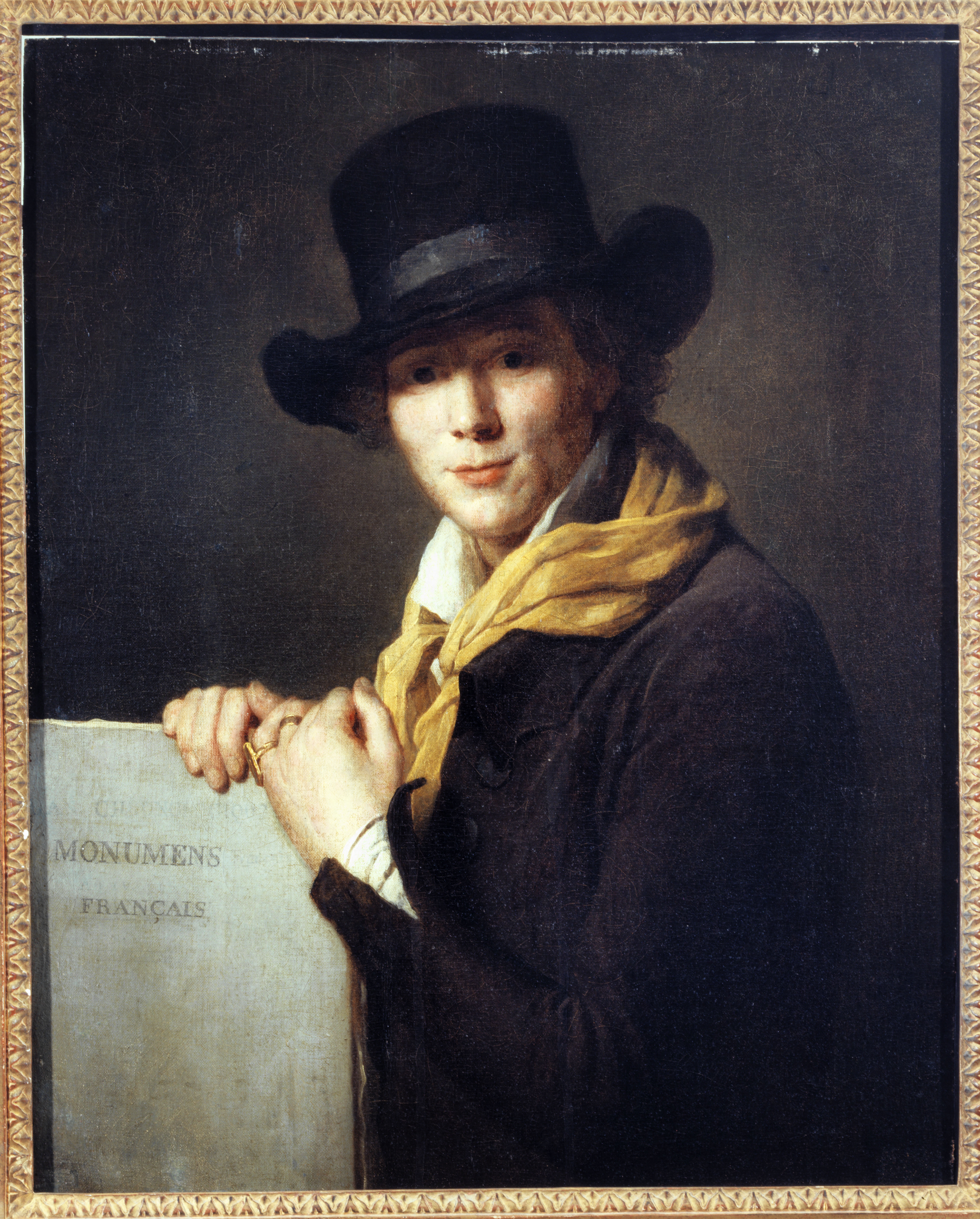
Portrait of Alexandre Lenoir, 1796
