= Pierre-Maximilien Delafontaine =

French painter

Pierre-Maximilien Delafontaine (1777 – 1 December 1860) was a French painter. After a long illness he re-established himself as a bronze sculptor.

== Life ==
Delafontaine was born in 1774, in Paris to Jean-Baptiste-Maximilien Delafontaine and Marie-Louise de La Brière. He studied under Jacques-Louis David. He exhibited at the Paris Salons 1798 and 1799. According to the Salon catalogues, he lived at 123 rue Saint-Honoré, in the Hôtel d'Aligre. On 23 June 1800 he married Émilie-Claude Herbillon from the Pont-sur-Seine. He died in Paris.

== Works ==
- The Skater (Bertrand Andrieu), 1798 (Hôtel de la Monnaie)
- Portrait of Xavier Bichat, 1799 (Musée national du Château de Versailles, )
- Portrait of Alexandre Lenoir, 19th century ()
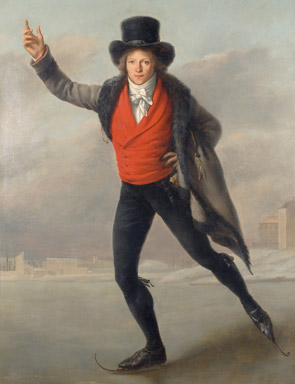
The Skater (Bertrand Andrieu), 1798 (Hôtel de la Monnaie)

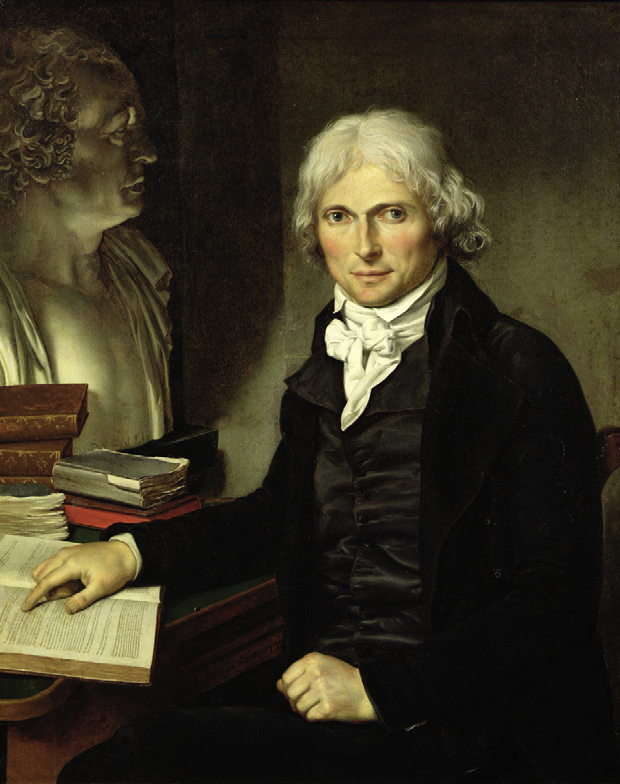
Portrait of Xavier Bichat, 1799 (Musée national du Château de Versailles)

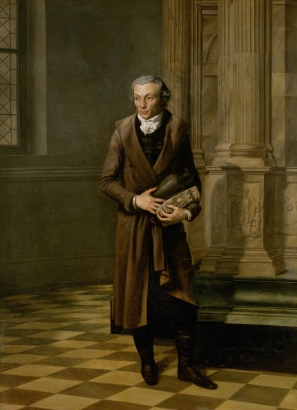
Portrait of Alexandre Lenoir, 19th century
