= Ide (Thracian Chersonese) =

Ancient Greek city located in Thrace

Coordinates: 40°30′15″N 26°41′21″E

Ide (Ancient Greek: Ἴδη) was an ancient Greek city located in ancient Thrace, located in the region of the Thracian Chersonesus. It is cited in the Periplus of Pseudo-Scylax, in the second position of its recitation of the towns of the Thracian Chersonesus, along with Cardia, Ide, Paeon, Alopeconnesus, Araplus, Elaeus and Sestos.

Its site is located 4 miles (6.5 km) west of Bolayir, Çanakkale Province, Turkey.

== See also ==
- Greek colonies in Thrace
