= Paeon (Thrace) =

Ancient Greek city in Thrace

Coordinates: 40°30′20″N 26°38′23″E

Paeon or Paion (Ancient Greek: Παιών) was an ancient Greek city located in ancient Thrace, on the west coast of the Thracian Chersonesus. It is cited in the Periplus of Pseudo-Scylax, in the third position of its recitation of the towns of the Thracian Chersonesus, along with Cardia, Ide, Paeon, Alopeconnesus, Araplus, Elaeus and Sestos.

Its site is tentatively located near Ece Liman, Çanakkale Province, Turkey.

== See also ==
- Greek colonies in Thrace
