= Xanthippus (disambiguation) =

Xanthippus is the name of:

- Xanthippus (father of Pericles) (c. 520–475 BC), wealthy Athenian politician and general
- Xanthippus (son of Pericles) (died 429 BC), one of the sons of Pericles and grandson of the above
- Xanthippus (Spartan commander), 3rd century BC Spartan general who fought for Carthage during the First Punic War
