= Limnae (Thrace) =

Ancient city in Thrace

Coordinates: 40°16′14″N 26°16′22″E

Limnae or Limnai (Ancient Greek: Λίμναι), was an ancient Greek city dating back to 7th century B.C. on the Gallipoli peninsula. The city was founded by migrants coming from Ionia. The city was one of the richest and most busy seaports of the Gallipoli region in its time and maintained its existence until the Roman era.

Limnae is covered by several ancient authors. Strabo places Limnae between Drabus and Alopeconnesus. According to Anaximenes of Miletus, it was a colony of Miletus. It belonged to the Delian League as it appears in Athenian tribute lists from 447/6 to 429/8 BCE. Limnae also appears in Stephanus of Byzantium and Pseudo-Scymnus.

Until 2018, the existence of the ancient city was known from ancient texts, but the exact location was not certain. In 2018, the city was discovered near the Beşyol plain. According to the archaeologists: "Only pieces of bowls, crockery and tiles can be seen on the surface since the architectural remnants of the city are underground. However, these pieces give us information about the field the city covered, as well as when the city was established and when it was desolated."
