= Araplus =

Ancient Greek city in Thrace

Araplus or Araplos (Ancient Greek: Ἄραπλος) was an ancient Greek city located in ancient Thrace, located in the region of the Thracian Chersonesus. It is cited in the Periplus of Pseudo-Scylax, in the fifth position of its recitation of the towns of the Thracian Chersonesus, along with Cardia, Ide, Paeon, Alopeconnesus, Araplus, Elaeus and Sestos.

Its site is unlocated.

== See also ==
- Greek colonies in Thrace
