= Elaeus =

Ancient city of the Thracian Chersonnese

- Ἐλαιοῦς (Ancient Greek)
- Elaeus and the Hellespont

- Location within Turkey
- 40°3′35″N 26°13′50″E
- Type: Settlement
- Location: Seddülbahir, Çanakkale Province, Turkey
- Region: Thracian Chersonese

History
- Built by: Colonists from Teos

Elaeus (Ancient Greek: Ἐλαιοῦς Elaious, later Ἐλεοῦς Elaeus), the “Olive City”, was an ancient Greek city located in Thrace, on the Thracian Chersonese. Elaeus was located at the southern end of the Hellespont (now the Dardanelles) near the southernmost point of the Thracian Chersonese (now the Gallipoli peninsula) in modern-day Turkey. According to the geographer Scymnus, Elaeus was founded by settlers from Ionian Teos, while the Pseudo-Scymnus writes that it was a colony of Athens and was founded by Phorbas.

== History ==
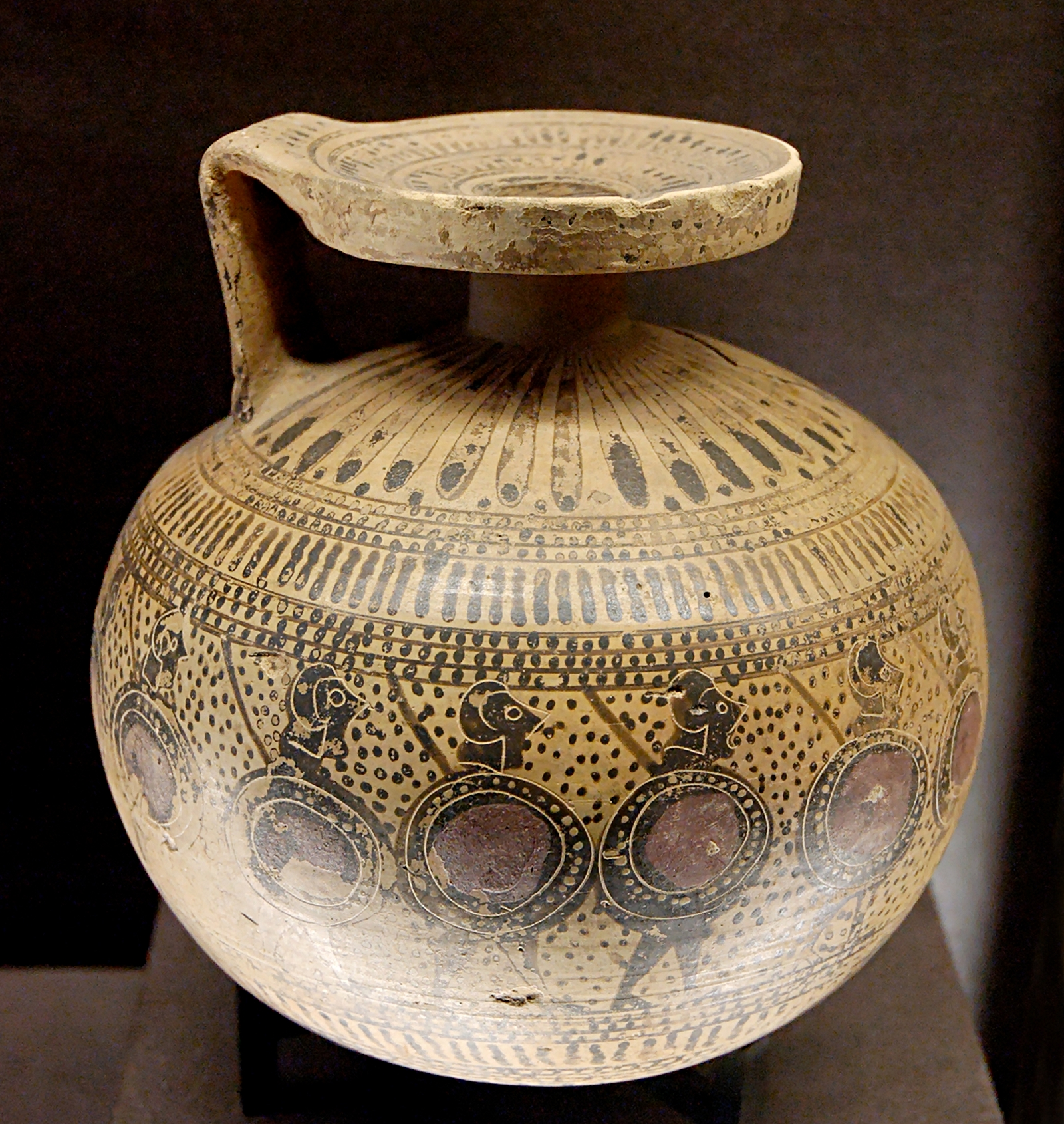
Hoplites on a globular aryballos from Elaeus.

The most important cities of the Chersonese were Lysimachia, Pactya, Gallipoli, Alopekonnesos, Sestos, Madytos and Elaeus. The peninsula was renowned for its wheat. It also profited from its strategic location on the main trade route between Europe and Asia, as well as the possibility of controlling shipping to Crimea. For these reasons, Elaeus later received colonists from Athens, who built fortifications there.

According to Plutarch, the city was founded by an Ephesian who was called Hegesistratus, after he consulted the oracle at Delphi.

The last resting place of the mythological hero Protesilaus was said to be at Elaeus, near a steep coastal cliff. According to Homer’s Iliad, Protesilaus was the first Greek to set foot on land during the Trojan War, for which - according to the will of the gods - he was also the first to die. His tomb at Elaeus lay on the European coast opposite Troy, and became a destination for pilgrimages by members of the cult of Protesilaus. Later, the temple housed votive offerings, and was surrounded by a settlement. In antiquity, the location was variously under Athenian, Persian, Spartan and later Macedonian control.

During the second Persian invasion of Greece (480 - 479 BCE), the Persian headquarters was temporarily located at Elaeus. Under Persian occupation, the governor Artayctes desecrated the sacred grove of Protesilaus. For this, he was captured and crucified in 479 BCE by the Athenian general Xanthippos, the father of Pericles.

In 411 BCE, the Athenian squadron under Thrasyllus escaped with difficulty from Sestus to Elaeus; and it was here, just before the fatal Battle of Aegospotami (405 BCE), that the 180 Athenian triremes arrived in time to hear that Lysander was master of Lampsacus. A stele dating from the year 340 BCE, at which time Elaeus was governed by Athens, contains an inscription in Ionian script. The stele proclaimed that the Athenians gave certain privileges, such as political rights and ownership of property, to the people of Elaeus, and that the Athenian general Chares was charged with watching over them. Elaeus belonged to the Delian League, and from 375 BCE to the Second Athenian League.

Alexander the Great is said to have visited Elaeus at the start of his Persian campaign in the spring of 334 BCE, in order to visit the temple of Protesilaus. Here he made an offering, before crossing the Dardanelles, and himself becoming the first of his army to set foot in Asia. In 200 BCE Elaeus surrendered voluntarily to Philip V of Macedon, but in 190 BCE the citizens made overtures to the Romans.

Imperial coins were struck at Elaeus in the time of the Roman emperor Commodus, of which a few remain. They depict Protesilaus as a warrior standing on the bow of a ship, ready to be the first to spring onto the enemy shore. Constantine's fleet in the Civil wars of the Tetrarchy, 323 CE, took up its moorings at Elaeus, while that of Licinius was anchored off the tomb of Ajax, in the Troad. Justinian fortified this important position.

During the First World War, French and British troops temporarily occupied Cape Helles and Morto Bay. The French Army encountered ancient remains while digging trenches. Fortuitous excavations were thus undertook under fire; operations were mainly supervised by Assyriologist Édouard Dhorme and exhumed artefacts were sent to the Louvre. French excavations resumed from 1920 to 1923.

== See also ==
- Greek colonies in Thrace
- Demophon of Elaeus

== Sources ==
- Pseudo-Scymnus, Periodos to Nicomedes ("Periegesis") (in Ancient Greek), Line 707
- Procopius, "Ch. 10", Buildings of Justinian, vol. 4, Lines 3 and 26
- Herodotus, Histories, vol. 7, pp. 22–24 and 33
- Arrian, "11. Alexander Crosses the Hellespont and Visits Troy", The Campaigns of Alexander, vol. 1, archived from the original on 7 November 2015
- Hansen, M. H.; Nielsen, T. H.; et al. (2005), "Thracian Chersonesos", An Inventory of Archaic and Classical Poleis, Oxford University Press
- Freely, John (2004), The Western Shores of Turkey, Tauris Parke Paperbacks, p. 19
- Harding, Philipp (1985), "Section 94", From the End of the Peloponnesian War to the Battle of Ipsus, Cambridge University Press, p. 118
- Danoff, Christo M. (1967), Elaius, Der Kleine Pauly (KlP) (in German), vol. 2, Stuttgart, pp. 231–232
- Instinsky, H. U. (1949), Alexander der Große am Hellespont (in German), Bad Godesberg: Helmut Küpper Verlag
- Choiseul-Gouffier (1842), Voyage pittoresque dans l'Empire Ottoman (in French), vol. 3 (2nd ed.), Paris, p. 373f
