= Agariste (mother of Pericles) =

Mother of the Athenian statesman Pericles

- Αγαρίστη
- Spouse: Xanthippus
- Children: Pericles, Ariphron
- Father: Hippocrates
- Family: Alcmaeonidae

Agariste (c. 520-510 BCE - ?) was the mother of the Athenian statesman Pericles.

Agariste was the daughter of Hippocrates, a member of the Alcmaeonidae family, a wealthy, powerful, a notorious family in Ancient Greece. She was named for her grandmother, Agariste of Sicyon. Around 500 BCE, she married Xanthippus, a politician and military leader who would later command the Athenian fleets in victory at the Battle of Mycale. Their first child was a boy, Ariphron. They had a daughter, whose name is not preserved, and another son, Pericles.

According to Herodotus (6.131), a few days before Pericles' birth, she had a dream where she gave birth to a lion, which the ancient Greeks believed foretold the prominence of Pericles. Thomas Harrison notes that this story "is widely understood to refer to the Athenian empire of the period of Pericles’ dominance.
