= Drabus =

Coastal Greek town in ancient Thrace

Coordinates: 40°21′29″N 26°20′09″E

Drabus or Drabos (Ancient Greek: Δράβος) was a coastal Greek town in ancient Thrace, on the Thracian Chersonesus.

There have been inconclusive attempts to identify Drabus with Araplus. Drabus' site is tentatively located near Ece Limani, in European Turkey.

== See also ==
- Greek colonies in Thrace
