= Artayctes =

5th-century BC Persian general and governor

Artaÿctes

Governor of Sestos
- In office ? – 479 BC

Personal details
- Died: 479 BC Sestos, Achaemenid Empire (present-day Turkey)
- Cause of death: Execution by crucifixion
- Military career
- Allegiance: Achaemenid Empire
- Rank: General
- Commands: Macrones and Mossynoeci forces
- Conflicts: Second Persian invasion of Greece

Artaÿctes (Greek: Ἀρταΰκτης, romanized: Artauktēs; died 479 BC) is a historical figure described in Herodotus' The Histories. Artaÿctes, the son of Cherasmis, was a Persian general who commanded the Macrones and Mossynoeci forces in the army of Xerxes during the second Persian invasion of Greece in 480-479 BC. During that period, Artaÿctes was also a tyrant in Sestos where he was captured and crucified by Athenian forces in 479.

== Background ==
After the defeat of the Persian army in the Battle of Plataea and the Battle of Mycale, the remaining Persians and their allies made for Sestos, the strongest town in the Thracian Chersonesos. The Greek fleet sailed to the Hellespont to destroy the pontoon bridges placed there by the Persians when they had crossed from Asia Minor to Greece but found that this had already been done. The Peloponnesians then sailed home, but the Athenians, commanded by Xanthippus, decided to try to retake the Thracian Chersonesos from the Persians. The Athenian army landed on the Thracian Chersonesos near Sestos and surrounded the city, of which Artaÿctes was governor.

== Governor ==
According to Herodotus, Artaÿctes' rule over the city-state of Sestos was a reign of terror. Originally, Sestos had been a Greek stronghold. Herodotus describes that when Artaÿctes was made governor of the city, he claimed all treasures present in the region, and desecrated many Greek places of worship. For example, Artaÿctes plundered the Sestos cemetery near Elaeus and the sanctuary and temple of hero Protesilaus of Thessaly at Elaeus, and built a Persian temple complex on top of it.

== Siege of Sestos ==
Herodotus describes that Artaÿctes was taken by surprise by the arrival of the Athenian military forces. By surrounding the city of Sestos, the Athenians had trapped Artaÿctes in his own capital, and with him, the equipment needed to build a new pontoon bridge. After the siege had lasted several months, little progress in retaking the city had been made, and the Athenian soldiers became somewhat discontented. However, the Athenian officers were determined to take the city.

The Athenian siege dragged on, but eventually, when the food ran out in the city, the Persians fled at night through the least guarded part of the city wall. The Athenians were thus able to take possession of the city the next day.

== Artaÿctes' death ==
According to Herodotus, the Athenian army was informed by the inhabitants of Sestos about the departure of the Persians. The Athenians subsequently pursued the Persians. They encountered Artaÿctes and his military unit near the river Geite. Most of Artaÿctes' men were killed in the subsequent battle. Artaÿctes, however, was captured and taken back to Sestos. Herodotus describes how Artaÿctes pleaded for his life and for the life of his son. He offered 100 talents to the gods and 200 to the Athenians if they would spare their lives. However, the Greek general Xanthippus was obliged to hand over Artaÿctes to the people of Elaeus, a town which Artaÿctes had plundered while governor of Sestos. Artaÿctes was then crucified by the people. While Artaÿctes was dying, he witnessed his son being stoned to death.

Herodotus then finishes his Histories by mentioning an account of Artembares, the grandfather of Artaÿctes, suggesting Cyrus the Great to abandon the rocky land of Persia (Persis) and live in a better region in the empire, and Cyrus warned him that "soft countries breed soft men". Herodotus is said to be trying to point out that the Persians failed to follow this advice later on, and that it was also a veiled warning to the Athenians, who later did the same.
