= Paralus and Xanthippus =

Sons of 5th-century BC Athenian leader Pericles

Paralus and Xanthippus (Gr. Πάραλος and Ξάνθιππος) were the two legitimate sons of Pericles, Xanthippus being the older one and Paralus the younger, and hence members of the Alcmaeonid family. Xanthippus was named after Pericles' father, while Paralus was named after the sacred trireme and flagship of the Athenian fleet.

They were educated by their father with the greatest care, but they both appear to have been of inferior capacity, which was uncompensated by their poor worth of character, although contemporary and some later writers seemed to consider Paralus to have been a somewhat more hopeful youth with more potential than his brother. Both of them had the nickname of Blitomammas (Βλιτομάμμας, literally "cabbage sucker", an epithet for a slow or dim-witted person). Both Xanthippus and Paralus, along with their mother, fell victims to the plague in 429 BC. Pericles himself succumbed shortly thereafter.
