= Pericles =

Athenian statesman and general (c. 495-429)

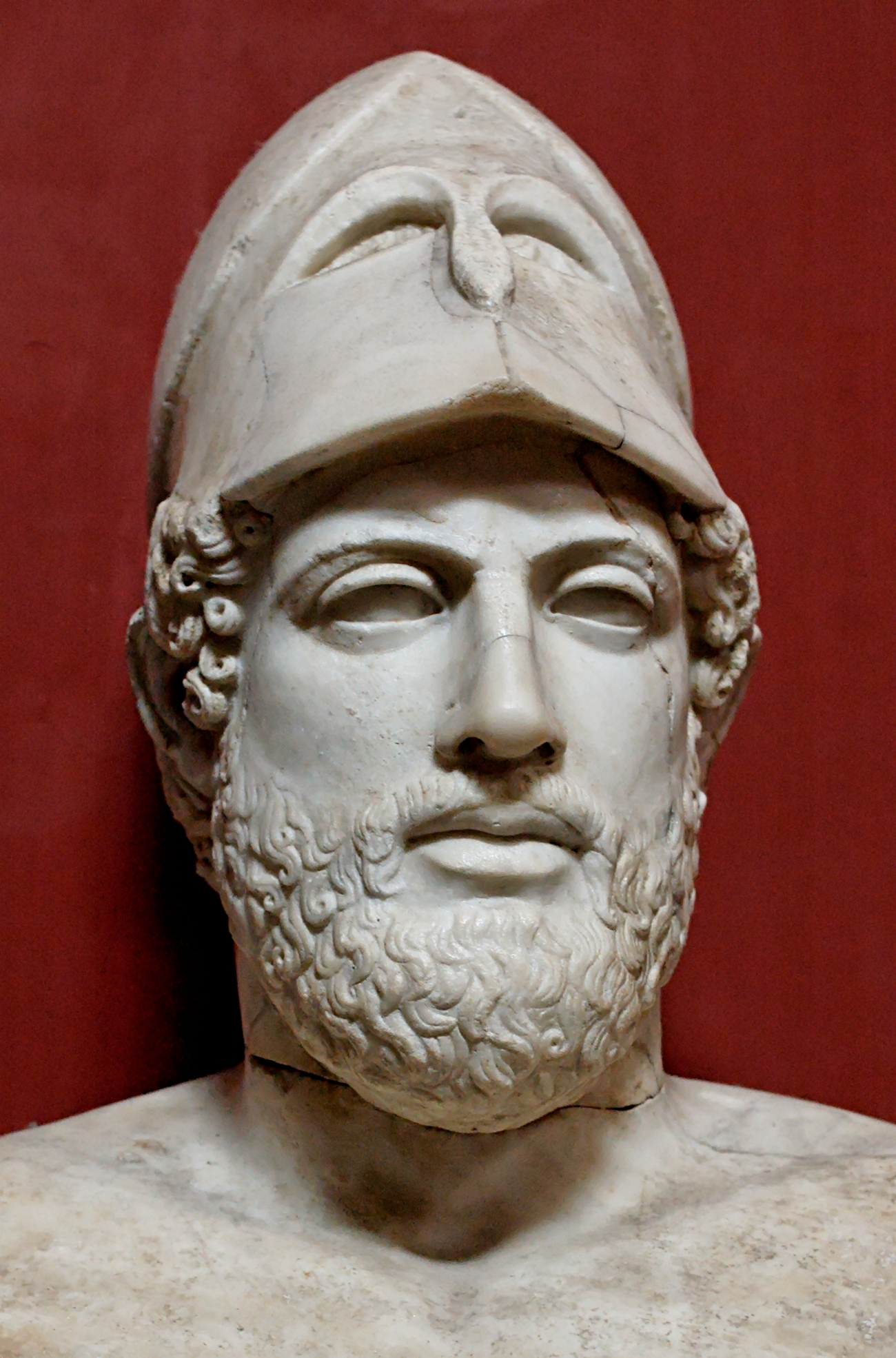
- Bust of Pericles bearing the inscription "Pericles, son of Xanthippus, Athenian". Marble, Roman copy after a Greek original from c. 430 BC, Museo Pio-Clementino, Vatican Museums.
- Born: c. 495 BC; Athens, Greece
- Died: 429 BC (aged 65/66); Athens, Greece
- Children: Paralus and Xanthippus; Pericles the Younger
- Relatives: Xanthippus (father); Agariste (mother)
- Military career
- Allegiance: Athens
- Rank: Strategos
- Conflicts: First Peloponnesian War; Battles of Sicyon and Acarnania; Second Sacred War; Samian War; Peloponnesian War

Pericles (/ˈpɛrɪkliːz/; Ancient Greek: Περικλῆς; c. 495–429 BC) was a Greek statesman and general during the Golden Age of Athens. He was prominent and influential in Ancient Athenian politics, particularly between the Greco-Persian Wars and the Peloponnesian War, and was acclaimed by Thucydides, a contemporary historian, as "the first citizen of Athens". Pericles turned the Delian League into an Athenian empire and led his countrymen during the first two years of the Peloponnesian War. The period during which he led Athens as its preeminent orator and statesman, roughly from 461 to 429 BC, is sometimes known as the "Age of Pericles", but the period thus denoted can include times as early as the Persian Wars or as late as the following century.

Pericles promoted the arts and literature, and it was principally through his efforts that Athens acquired the reputation of being the educational and cultural centre of the ancient Greek world. He started an ambitious project that generated most of the surviving structures on the Acropolis, including the Parthenon. This project beautified and protected the city, exhibited its glory, and gave work to its people. Pericles also fostered Athenian democracy to such an extent that critics called him a populist. Pericles was descended, through his mother, from the powerful and historically influential Alcmaeonid family. He, along with several members of his family, succumbed to the Plague of Athens in 429 BC, which weakened the city-state during a protracted conflict with Sparta.

== Early years ==
Pericles was born c. 495 BC, in Athens, Greece. (Note: Pericles's date of birth is uncertain; he could not have been born later than 492–1 and been of age to present the Persae in 472. He is not recorded as having taken part in the Persian Wars of 480–79; some historians argue from this that he was unlikely to have been born before 498, but this argument ex silentio has also been dismissed.) He was the son of the politician Xanthippus, who, though ostracised in 485–484 BC, returned to Athens to command the Athenian contingent in the Greek victory at Mycale just five years later. Pericles's mother, Agariste, was a member of the powerful and controversial noble family of the Alcmaeonidae, and her familial connections played a crucial role in helping start his political career. Agariste was the great-granddaughter of the tyrant of Sicyon, Cleisthenes, and the niece of the Athenian reformer Cleisthenes. (Note: Plutarch says "granddaughter" of Cleisthenes, but this is chronologically implausible, and there is consensus that this should be "niece".) Pericles belonged to the Attic phyle (clan) of Acamantis. His early years were quiet; the introverted young Pericles avoided public appearances, instead preferring to devote his time to his studies.

According to Herodotus and Plutarch, Agariste dreamed, a few nights before Pericles's birth, that she had borne a lion. Legends say that Philip II of Macedon had a similar dream before the birth of his son, Alexander the Great. One interpretation of the dream treats the lion as a traditional symbol of greatness, but the story may also allude to the unusually large size of Pericles's skull, which became a popular target of contemporary comedians (who called him "Squill-head", after the squill or sea-onion). Although Plutarch claims that this deformity was the reason that Pericles was always depicted wearing a helmet, this is not the case; the helmet was actually the symbol of his official rank as strategos (general).

His family's nobility and wealth allowed him to fully pursue his inclination toward education. He learned music from the masters of the time (Damon or Pythocleides could have been his teacher) and he is considered to have been the first politician to attribute importance to philosophy. He enjoyed the company of the philosophers Protagoras, Zeno of Elea, and Anaxagoras. Anaxagoras, in particular, became a close friend and influenced him greatly.

Pericles's manner of thought and rhetorical charisma may have possibly been in part products of Anaxagoras's emphasis on emotional calm in the face of trouble, and scepticism about divine phenomena. His proverbial calmness and self-control are also often regarded as products of Anaxagoras's influence.

== Political career until 431 BC ==
=== Entering politics ===
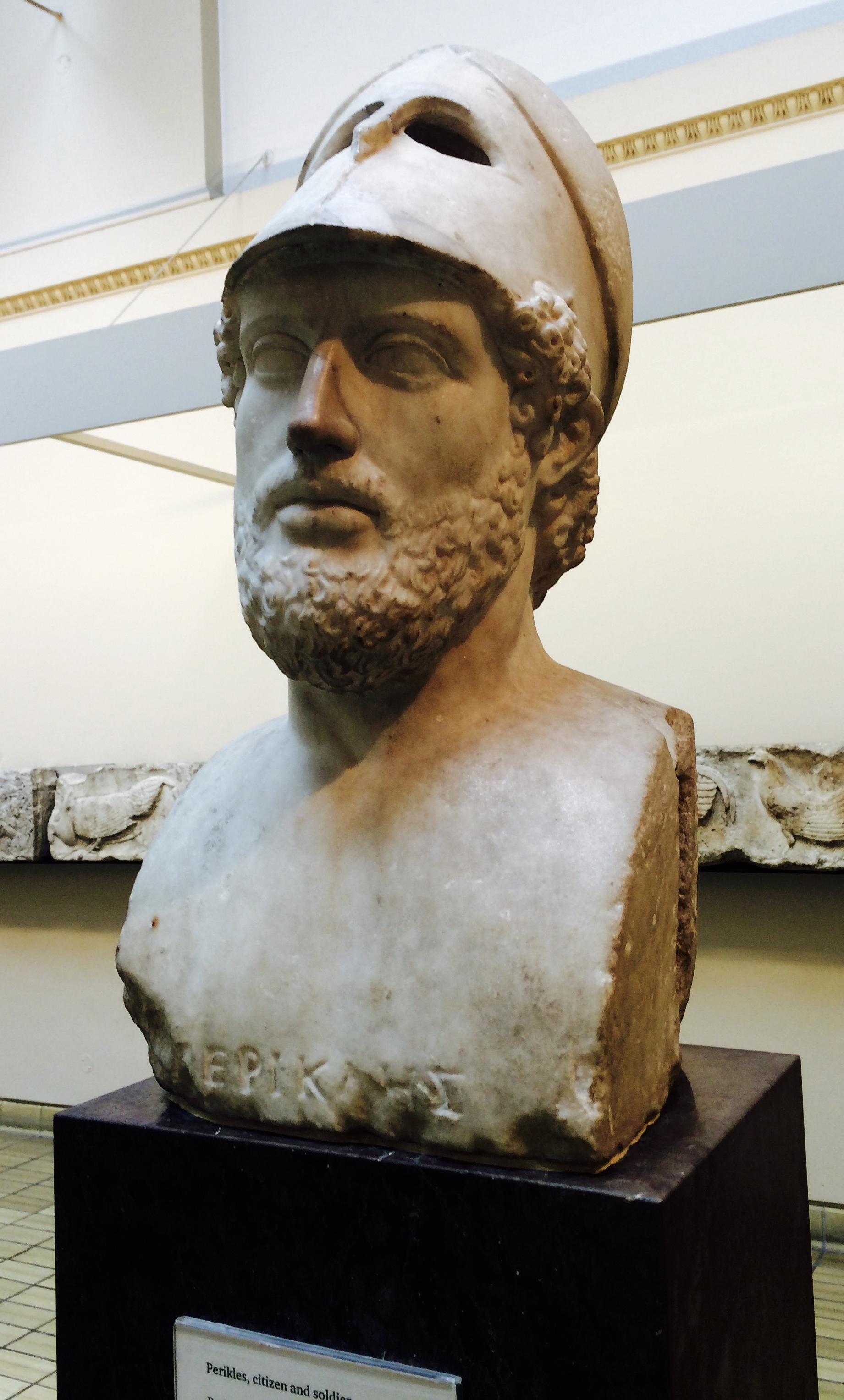
Bust of Pericles, Roman copy of a Greek original, British Museum

In the spring of 472 BC, Pericles presented The Persians of Aeschylus at the Greater Dionysia as a liturgy, demonstrating that he was one of the wealthier men of Athens. Simon Hornblower has argued that Pericles's selection of this play, which presents a nostalgic picture of Themistocles's famous victory at Salamis, shows that the young politician was supporting Themistocles against his political opponent Cimon, whose faction succeeded in having Themistocles ostracised shortly afterward.

Plutarch says that Pericles stood first among the Athenians for forty years. If this was so, Pericles must have taken up a position of leadership by the early 460s BC, which would be in his early or mid-thirties. Throughout these years he endeavoured to protect his privacy and to present himself as a model for his fellow citizens. For example, he would often avoid banquets, trying to be frugal.

In 463 BC, Pericles was the leading prosecutor of Cimon, the leader of the conservative faction who was accused of neglecting Athens's vital interests in Macedon. Although Cimon was acquitted, this confrontation proved that Pericles's major political opponent was vulnerable.

=== Ostracising Cimon ===
Around 461 BC, the leadership of the democratic party decided it was time to take aim at the Areopagus, a traditional council controlled by the Athenian aristocracy, which had once been the most powerful body in the state. The leader of the party and mentor of Pericles, Ephialtes, proposed a reduction of the Areopagus's powers. The Ecclesia (the Athenian Assembly) adopted Ephialtes's proposal without opposition. This reform signalled the beginning of a new era of "radical democracy".

The democratic party gradually became dominant in Athenian politics, and Pericles seemed willing to follow a populist policy to cajole the public. According to Aristotle, Pericles's stance can be explained by the fact that his principal political opponent, Cimon, was both rich and generous, and was able to gain public favour by lavishly handing out portions of his sizeable personal fortune. The historian Loren J. Samons II argues, however, that Pericles had enough resources to make a political mark by private means, had he so chosen.

In 461 BC, Pericles achieved the political elimination of this opponent using ostracism. The accusation was that Cimon betrayed his city by aiding Sparta.

After Cimon's ostracism, Pericles continued to promote a populist social policy. He first proposed a decree that permitted the poor to watch theatrical plays without paying, with the state covering the cost of their admission. With other decrees he lowered the property requirement for the archonship in 458–457 BC and bestowed generous wages on all citizens who served as jurymen in the Heliaia (the supreme court of Athens) some time just after 454 BC. His most controversial measure, however, was a law of 451 BC limiting Athenian citizenship to those of Athenian parentage on both sides.

Such measures impelled Pericles's critics to hold him responsible for the gradual degeneration of the Athenian democracy. The 19th century Greek historian Constantine Paparrigopoulos, argued that Pericles sought for the expansion and stabilisation of all democratic institutions. Accordingly, he enacted legislation granting the lower classes access to the political system and the public offices, from which they had previously been barred.

According to Samons, Pericles believed that it was necessary to raise the demos, in which he saw an untapped source of Athenian power and the crucial element of Athenian military dominance. (The fleet, backbone of Athenian power since the days of Themistocles, was manned almost entirely by members of the lower classes).

Cimon, in contrast, apparently believed that no further free space for democratic evolution existed. He was certain that democracy had reached its peak and Pericles's reforms were leading to the stalemate of populism. According to Paparrigopoulos, history vindicated Cimon, because Athens, after Pericles's death, sank into the abyss of political turmoil and demagogy. Paparrigopoulos maintained that an unprecedented regression descended upon the city, whose glory perished as a result of Pericles's populist policies.

According to another historian, Justin Daniel King, radical democracy benefited people individually, but harmed the state. In contrast, Donald Kagan asserted that the democratic measures Pericles put into effect provided the basis for an unassailable political strength. After all, Cimon finally accepted the new democracy and did not oppose the citizenship law, after he returned from exile in 451 BC.

=== Leading Athens ===
Ephialtes's murder in 461 BC paved the way for Pericles to consolidate his authority. (Note: According to Aristotle, Aristodicus of Tanagra killed Ephialtes. Plutarch cites an Idomeneus as saying that Pericles killed Ephialtes, but does not believe him – he finds it to be out of character for Pericles.) Without opposition after the expulsion of Cimon, the unchallengeable leader of the democratic party became the unchallengeable ruler of Athens. He remained in power until his death in 429 BC.

==== First Peloponnesian War ====
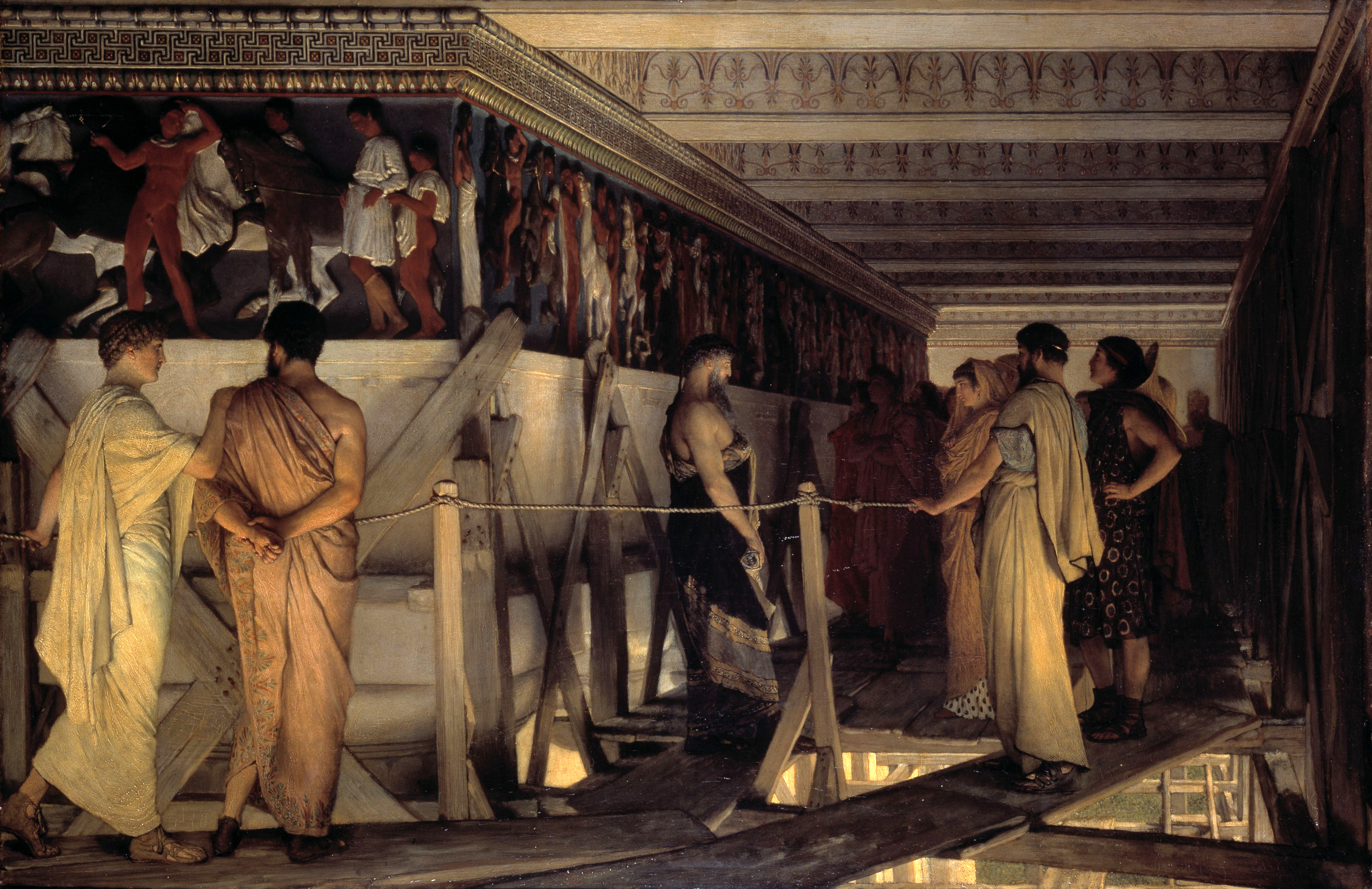
Phidias Showing the Frieze of the Parthenon to Pericles, Aspasia, Alcibiades and Friends, by Sir Lawrence Alma-Tadema, 1868, Birmingham Museum & Art Gallery

Pericles made his first military excursions during the First Peloponnesian War, which was caused in part by Athens's alliance with Megara and Argos and the subsequent reaction of Sparta. In 454 BC he attacked Sicyon and Acarnania. He then unsuccessfully tried to conquer Oeniadea on the Corinthian Gulf, before returning to Athens. In 451 BC, Cimon returned from exile and negotiated a five years' truce with Sparta after a proposal of Pericles, an event which indicates a shift in Pericles's political strategy. Pericles may have realized the importance of Cimon's contribution during the ongoing conflicts against the Peloponnesians and the Persians. Anthony Podlecki argues, however, that Pericles's alleged change of position was invented by ancient writers to support "a tendentious view of Pericles' shiftiness".

Plutarch states that Cimon struck a power-sharing deal with his opponents, according to which Pericles would carry through the interior affairs and Cimon would be the leader of the Athenian army, campaigning abroad. If it were actually made, this bargain would constitute a concession on Pericles's part that he was not a great strategist. Kagan's view is that Cimon adapted himself to the new conditions and promoted a political marriage between Periclean liberals and Cimonian conservatives.

In the mid-450s the Athenians launched an unsuccessful attempt to aid an Egyptian revolt against Persia, which led to a prolonged siege of a Persian fortress in the Nile Delta. The campaign culminated in disaster; the besieging force was defeated and destroyed. In 451–450 BC the Athenians sent troops to Cyprus. Cimon defeated the Persians in the Battle of Salamis-in-Cyprus, but died of disease in 449 BC. Pericles is said to have initiated both expeditions in Egypt and Cyprus, although some researchers, such as Karl Julius Beloch, argue that the dispatch of such a great fleet conforms with the spirit of Cimon's policy.

Complicating the account of this period is the issue of the Peace of Callias, which allegedly ended hostilities between the Greeks and the Persians. The very existence of the treaty is hotly disputed, and its particulars and negotiation are ambiguous. Ernst Badian believes that a peace between Athens and Persia was first ratified in 463 BC (making the Athenian interventions in Egypt and Cyprus violations of the peace), and renegotiated at the conclusion of the campaign in Cyprus, taking force again by 449–448 BC.

John Fine, in contrast, suggests that the first peace between Athens and Persia was concluded in 450–449 BC, due to Pericles's calculation that ongoing conflict with Persia was undermining Athens's ability to spread its influence in Greece and the Aegean. Kagan believes that Pericles used Callias, a brother-in-law of Cimon, as a symbol of unity and employed him several times to negotiate important agreements.

In the spring of 449 BC, Pericles proposed the Congress Decree, which led to a meeting ("Congress") of all Greek states to consider the question of rebuilding the temples destroyed by the Persians. The Congress failed because of Sparta's stance, but Pericles's intentions remain unclear. Some historians think that he wanted to prompt a confederation with the participation of all the Greek cities; others think he wanted to assert Athenian pre-eminence. According to the historian Terry Buckley the objective of the Congress Decree was a new mandate for the Delian League and for the collection of "phoros" (taxes).

During the Second Sacred War Pericles led the Athenian army against Delphi and reinstated Phocis in its sovereign rights on the oracle. In 447 BC Pericles engaged in his most admired excursion, the expulsion of barbarians from the Thracian peninsula of Gallipoli, to establish Athenian colonists in the region. At this time, however, Athens was seriously challenged by a number of revolts among its subjects. In 447 BC the oligarchs of Thebes conspired against the democratic faction. The Athenians demanded their immediate surrender, but after the Battle of Coronea, Pericles was forced to concede the loss of Boeotia to recover the prisoners taken in that battle. With Boeotia in hostile hands, Phocis and Locris became untenable and quickly fell under the control of hostile oligarchs.

In 446 BC, a more dangerous uprising erupted. Euboea and Megara revolted. Pericles crossed over to Euboea with his troops, but was forced to return when the Spartan army invaded Attica. Through bribery and negotiations, Pericles defused the imminent threat, and the Spartans returned home. When Pericles was later audited for the handling of public money, an expenditure of 10 talents was not sufficiently justified, since the official documents just referred that the money was spent for a "very serious purpose". Nonetheless, the "serious purpose" (namely the bribery) was so obvious to the auditors that they approved the expenditure without official meddling and without even investigating the mystery.

After the Spartan threat had been removed, Pericles crossed back to Euboea to crush the revolt there. He then punished the landowners of Chalcis, who lost their properties. The residents of Histiaea, meanwhile, who had butchered the crew of an Athenian trireme, were uprooted and replaced by 2,000 Athenian settlers. The crisis was brought to an official end by the Thirty Years' Peace (winter of 446–445 BC), in which Athens relinquished most of the possessions and interests on the Greek mainland which it had acquired since 460 BC, and both Athens and Sparta agreed not to attempt to win over the other state's allies.

==== Final battle with the conservatives ====
In 444 BC, the conservative and the democratic factions confronted each other in a fierce struggle. The ambitious new leader of the conservatives, Thucydides (not to be confused with the historian of the same name), accused Pericles of profligacy, criticising the way he spent the money for the ongoing building plan. Thucydides initially managed to incite the passions of the ecclesia regarding these charges in his favour. However, when Pericles took the floor, his resolute arguments put Thucydides and the conservatives firmly on the defensive. Finally, Pericles proposed to reimburse the city for all questionable expenses from his private property, with the proviso that he would make the inscriptions of dedication in his own name. His stance was greeted with applause, and Thucydides was soundly, if unexpectedly, defeated. In 442 BC, the Athenian public voted to ostracise Thucydides from the city for 10 years and Pericles was once again the unchallenged ruler of the Athenian political arena.

==== Athens's rule over its alliance ====
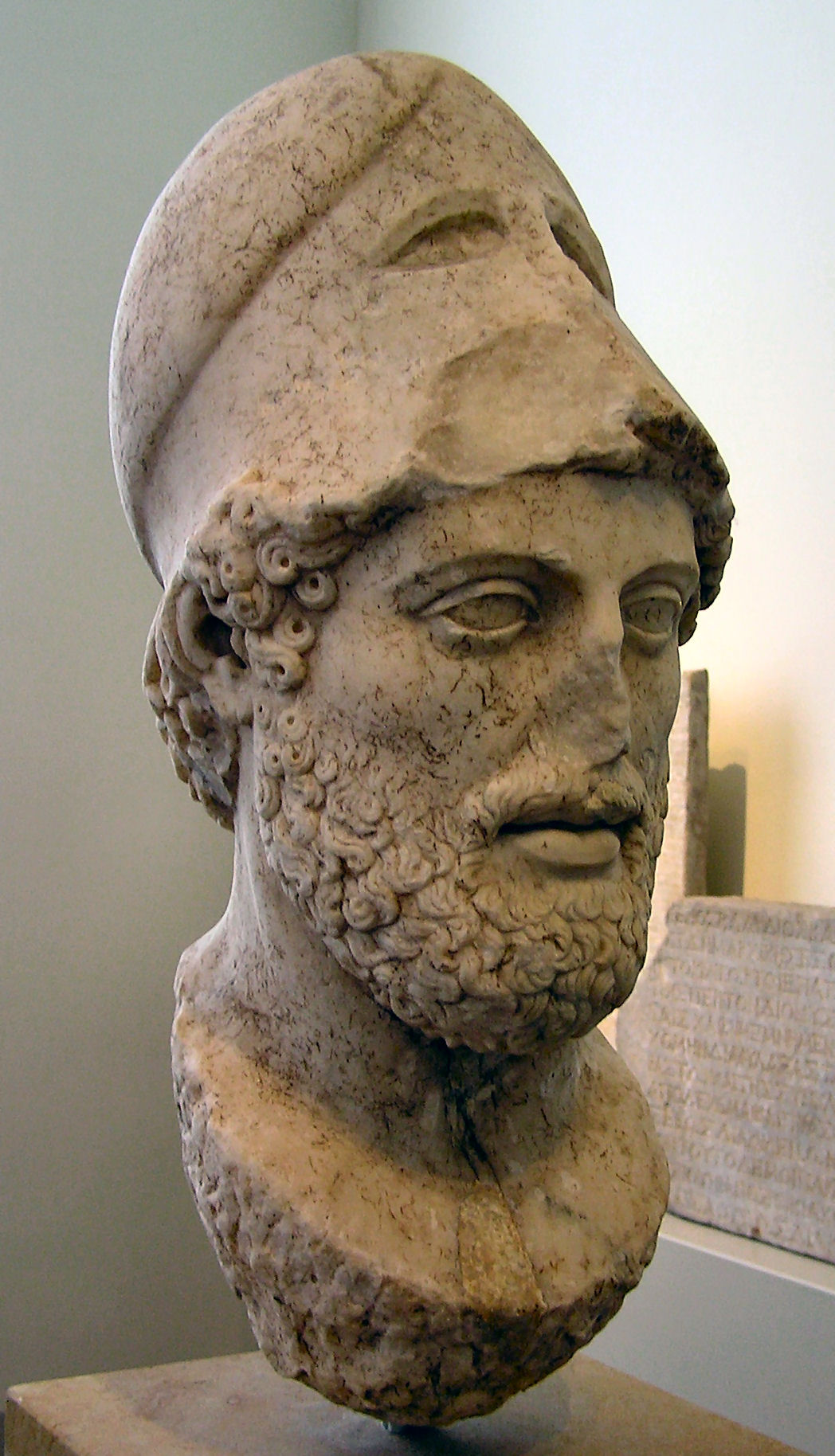
Bust of Pericles after Kresilas, Altes Museum, Berlin

Pericles wanted to stabilise Athens's dominance over its alliance and to enforce its pre-eminence in Greece. The process by which the Delian League transformed into an Athenian empire is generally considered to have begun well before Pericles's time, as various allies in the league chose to pay tribute to Athens instead of manning ships for the league's fleet, but the transformation was speeded and brought to its conclusion by Pericles.

The final steps in the shift to empire may have been triggered by Athens's defeat in Egypt, which challenged the city's dominance in the Aegean and led to the revolt of several allies, such as Miletus and Erythrae. Either because of a genuine fear for its safety after the defeat in Egypt and the revolts of the allies, or as a pretext to gain control of the League's finances, Athens transferred the treasury of the alliance from Delos to Athens in 454–453 BC.

By 450–449 BC the revolts in Miletus and Erythrae were quelled and Athens restored its rule over its allies. Around 447 BC Clearchus proposed the Coinage Decree, which imposed Athenian silver coinage, weights and measures on all of the allies. According to one of the decree's most stringent provisions, surplus from a minting operation was to go into a special fund, and anyone proposing to use it otherwise was subject to the death penalty.

It was from the alliance's treasury that Pericles drew the funds necessary to enable his ambitious building plan, centred on the "Periclean Acropolis", which included the Propylaea, the Parthenon and the golden statue of Athena, sculpted by Pericles's friend, Phidias. In 449 BC Pericles proposed a decree allowing the use of 9,000 talents to finance the major rebuilding programme of Athenian temples. Angelos Vlachos, a Greek Academician, points out the use of the alliance's treasury, initiated and executed by Pericles, as one of the largest embezzlements in human history; this misappropriation financed, however, some of the most marvellous artistic creations of the ancient world.

==== Samian War ====
The Samian War was one of the last significant military events before the Peloponnesian War. After Thucydides's ostracism, Pericles was re-elected yearly to the generalship, the only office he ever officially occupied, although his influence was so great as to make him the de facto ruler of the state. In 440 BC Samos went to war against Miletus over control of Priene, an ancient city of Ionia on the foot-hills of Mycale. Worsted in the war, the Milesians came to Athens to plead their case against the Samians.

When the Athenians ordered the two sides to stop fighting and submit the case to arbitration in Athens, the Samians refused. In response, Pericles passed a decree dispatching an expedition to Samos, "alleging against its people that, although they were ordered to break off their war against the Milesians, they were not complying". (Note: According to Plutarch, it was thought that Pericles proceeded against the Samians to gratify Aspasia of Miletus.)

In a naval battle the Athenians led by Pericles and nine other generals defeated the forces of Samos and imposed on the island an Athenian administration. When the Samians revolted against Athenian rule, Pericles compelled the rebels to capitulate after a tough siege of eight months, which resulted in substantial discontent among the Athenian sailors. Pericles then quelled a revolt in Byzantium and, when he returned to Athens, gave a funeral oration to honour the soldiers who died in the expedition.

Between 438 and 436 BC Pericles led Athens's fleet in Pontus and established friendly relations with the Greek cities of the region. Pericles focused also on internal projects, such as the fortification of Athens (the building of the "middle wall" about 440 BC), and on the creation of new cleruchies, such as Andros, Naxos and Thurii (444 BC) as well as Amphipolis (437–436 BC).

==== Personal attacks ====
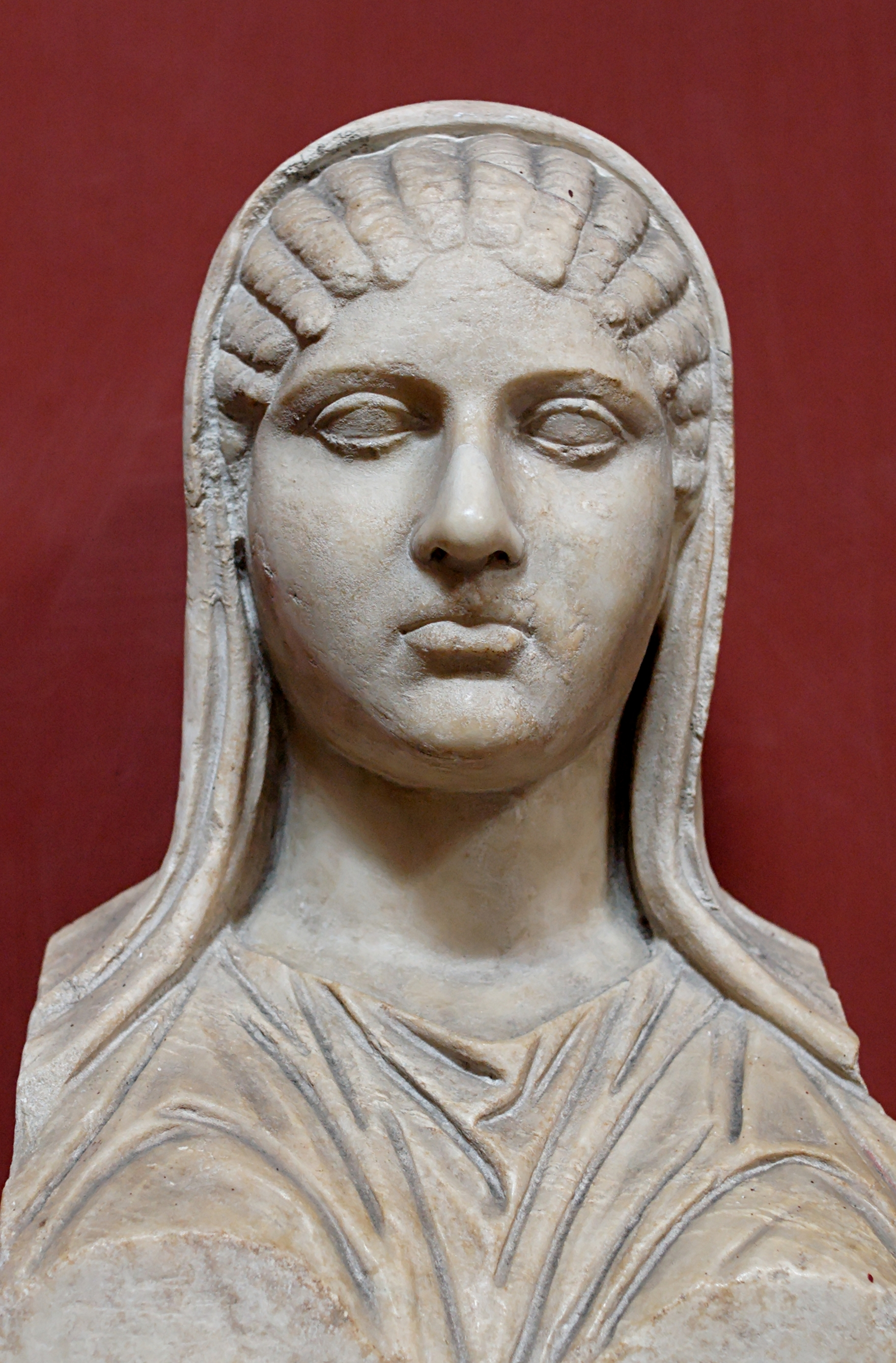
Aspasia of Miletus (c. 469 BC – c. 406 BC), Pericles's companion

Pericles and his friends were never immune from attack, as preeminence in democratic Athens was not equivalent to absolute rule. Just before the eruption of the Peloponnesian War, Pericles and two of his closest associates, Phidias and his companion, Aspasia, faced a series of personal and judicial attacks.

Phidias, who had been in charge of all building projects, was first accused of embezzling gold meant for the statue of Athena and then of impiety, because, when he wrought the battle of the Amazons on the shield of Athena, he carved out a figure that suggested himself as a bald old man, and also inserted a very fine likeness of Pericles fighting with an Amazon.

Aspasia, who was noted for her ability as a conversationalist and adviser, was accused of corrupting the women of Athens to satisfy Pericles's perversions. The accusations against her were probably nothing more than unproven slanders, but the whole experience was very bitter for Pericles. Although Aspasia was acquitted thanks to a rare emotional outburst of Pericles, his friend Phidias died in prison according to Plutarch; however, he is also credited with the later statue of Zeus at Olympia, therefore this is debated, and another friend of his, Anaxagoras, was attacked by the ecclesia for his religious beliefs.

Beyond these initial prosecutions, the ecclesia attacked Pericles himself by asking him to justify his ostensible profligacy with, and maladministration of, public money. According to Plutarch, Pericles was so afraid of the oncoming trial that he did not let the Athenians yield to the Lacedaemonians. Beloch also believes that Pericles deliberately brought on the war to protect his political position at home. Thus, at the start of the Peloponnesian War, Athens found itself in the awkward position of entrusting its future to a leader whose pre-eminence had just been seriously shaken for the first time in over a decade.

== Peloponnesian War ==
The causes of the Peloponnesian War have been much debated, but many ancient historians lay the blame on Pericles and Athens. Plutarch seems to believe that Pericles and the Athenians incited the war, scrambling to implement their belligerent tactics "with a sort of arrogance and a love of strife". (Note: Plutarch describes these allegations without espousing them. Thucydides insists, however, that the Athenian politician was still powerful. Gomme and Vlachos support Thucydides's view.) Thucydides hints at the same thing, believing the reason for the war was Sparta's fear of Athenian power and growth. However, as he is generally regarded as an admirer of Pericles, Thucydides has been criticised for bias against Sparta. (Note: Vlachos maintains that Thucydides's narration gives the impression that Athens's alliance had become an authoritarian and oppressive empire, while the historian makes no comment for Sparta's equally harsh rule. Vlachos underlines, however, that the defeat of Athens could entail a much more ruthless Spartan empire, something that did indeed happen. Hence, the historian's hinted assertion that Greek public opinion espoused Sparta's pledges of liberating Greece almost uncomplainingly seems tendentious. Geoffrey Ernest Maurice de Ste Croix, for his part, argues that Athens's imperium was welcomed and valuable for the stability of democracy all over Greece. According to Fornara and Samons, "any view proposing that popularity or its opposite can be inferred simply from narrow ideological considerations is superficial".)

=== Prelude to the war ===
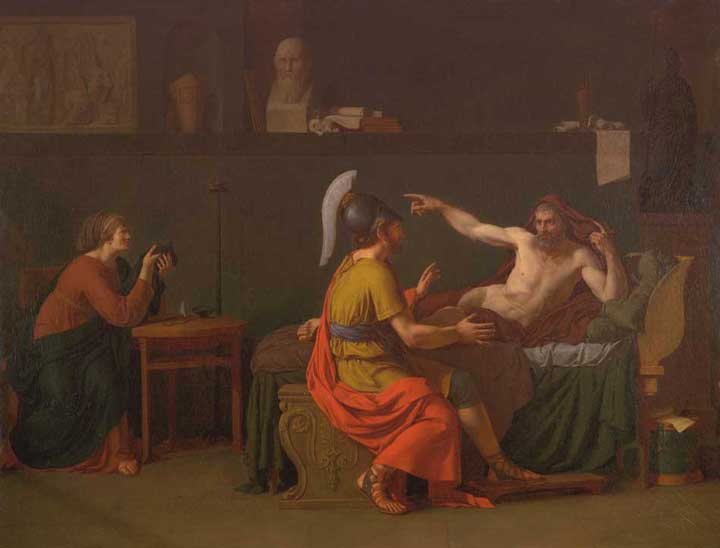
Anaxagoras and Pericles by Augustin-Louis Belle (1757–1841)

Pericles was convinced that the war against Sparta, which could not conceal its envy of Athens's pre-eminence, was inevitable if unfortunate. Therefore, he did not hesitate to send troops to Corcyra to reinforce the Corcyraean fleet, which was fighting against Corinth. In 433 BC the enemy fleets confronted each other at the Battle of Sybota and a year later the Athenians fought Corinthian colonists at the Battle of Potidaea; these two events contributed greatly to Corinth's lasting hatred of Athens. During the same period, Pericles proposed the Megarian decree, which resembled a modern trade embargo. According to the provisions of the decree, Megarian merchants were excluded from the market of Athens and the ports in its empire. This ban strangled the Megarian economy and strained the fragile peace between Athens and Sparta, which was allied with Megara. According to George Cawkwell, a praelector in ancient history, with this decree Pericles breached the Thirty Years' Peace "but, perhaps, not without the semblance of an excuse". The Athenians' justification was that the Megarians had cultivated the sacred land consecrated to Demeter and had given refuge to runaway slaves, a behaviour which the Athenians considered to be impious.

After consultations with its allies, Sparta sent a deputation to Athens demanding certain concessions, such as the immediate expulsion of the Alcmaeonidae family including Pericles and the retraction of the Megarian Decree, threatening war if the demands were not met. The obvious purpose of these proposals was the instigation of a confrontation between Pericles and the people; this event, indeed, would come about a few years later. At that time, the Athenians unhesitatingly followed Pericles's instructions. In the first legendary oration Thucydides puts in his mouth, Pericles advised the Athenians not to yield to their opponents' demands, since they were militarily stronger. Pericles was not prepared to make unilateral concessions, believing that "if Athens conceded on that issue, then Sparta was sure to come up with further demands". Consequently, Pericles asked the Spartans to offer a quid pro quo. In exchange for retracting the Megarian Decree, the Athenians demanded from Sparta to abandon their practice of periodic expulsion of foreigners from their territory (xenelasia) and to recognise the autonomy of its allied cities, a request implying that Sparta's hegemony was also ruthless. The terms were rejected by the Spartans, and with neither side willing to back down, the two cities prepared for war. According to Athanasios G. Platias and Constantinos Koliopoulos, professors of strategic studies and international politics, "rather than to submit to coercive demands, Pericles chose war". Another consideration that may well have influenced Pericles's stance was the concern that revolts in the empire might spread if Athens showed itself weak.

=== First year of the war (431 BC) ===
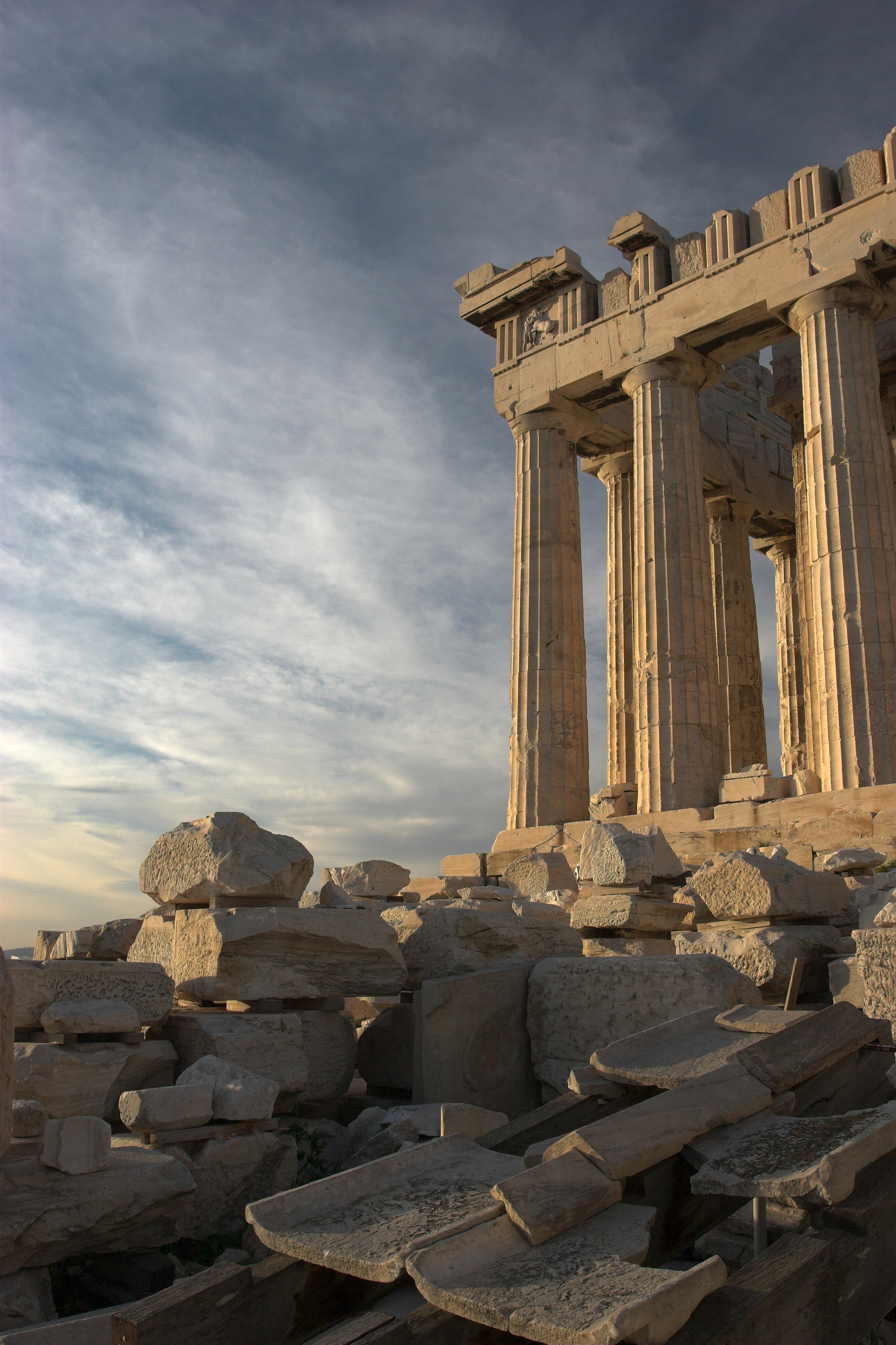
The Parthenon was prompted by Pericles.

In 431 BC, while peace already was precarious, Archidamus II, Sparta's king, sent a new delegation to Athens, demanding that the Athenians submit to Sparta's demands. This deputation was not allowed to enter Athens, as Pericles had already passed a resolution according to which no Spartan deputation would be welcomed if the Spartans had previously initiated any hostile military actions. The Spartan army was at this time gathered at Corinth, and, citing this as a hostile action, the Athenians refused to admit their emissaries. With his last attempt at negotiation thus declined, Archidamus invaded Attica, but found no Athenians there; Pericles, aware that Sparta's strategy would be to invade and ravage Athenian territory, had previously arranged to evacuate the entire population of the region to within the walls of Athens.

No definite record exists of how exactly Pericles managed to convince the residents of Attica to agree to move into the crowded urban areas. For most, the move meant abandoning their land and ancestral shrines and completely changing their lifestyle. Therefore, although they agreed to leave, many rural residents were far from happy with Pericles's decision. Pericles also gave his compatriots some advice on their present affairs and reassured them that, if the enemy did not plunder his farms, he would offer his property to the city. This promise was prompted by his concern that Archidamus, who was a friend of his, might pass by his estate without ravaging it, either as a gesture of friendship or as a calculated political move aimed to alienate Pericles from his constituents.

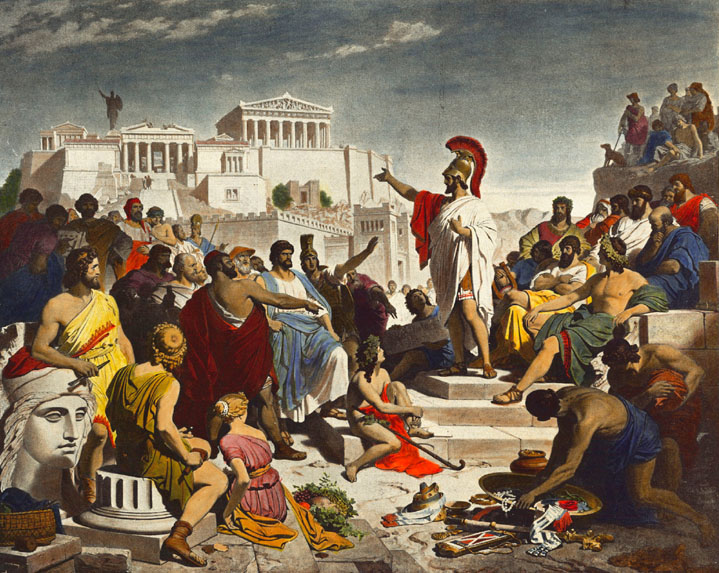
Pericles' Funeral Oration (Perikles hält die Leichenrede) by Philipp Foltz (1852)

In any case, seeing the pillage of their farms, the Athenians were outraged, and they soon began to indirectly express their discontent towards their leader, who many of them considered to have drawn them into the war. Even when in the face of mounting pressure, Pericles did not give in to the demands for immediate action against the enemy or revise his initial strategy. He also avoided convening the ecclesia, fearing that the populace, outraged by the unopposed ravaging of their farms, might rashly decide to challenge the vaunted Spartan army in the field. As meetings of the assembly were called at the discretion of its rotating presidents, the "prytani" (singular, "prytaneis"), Pericles had no formal control over their scheduling; rather, the respect in which Pericles was held by the prytanies was apparently sufficient to persuade them to do as he wished. While the Spartan army remained in Attica, Pericles sent a fleet of 100 ships to loot the coasts of the Peloponnese and charged the cavalry to guard the ravaged farms close to the walls of the city. When the enemy retired and the pillaging came to an end, Pericles proposed a decree according to which the authorities of the city should put aside 1,000 talents and 100 ships, in case Athens was attacked by naval forces. According to the most stringent provision of the decree, even proposing a different use of the money or ships would entail the penalty of death. During the autumn of 431 BC, Pericles led the Athenian forces that invaded Megara and a few months later (winter of 431–430 BC) he delivered his monumental and emotional Funeral Oration, honouring the Athenians who died for their city.

=== Last military operations and death ===
In 430 BC, the army of Sparta looted Attica for a second time, but Pericles was not daunted and refused to revise his initial strategy. Unwilling to engage the Spartan army in battle, he again led a naval expedition to plunder the coasts of the Peloponnese, this time taking 100 Athenian ships with him. According to Plutarch, just before the sailing of the ships an eclipse of the sun frightened the crews, but Pericles used the astronomical knowledge he had acquired from Anaxagoras to calm them. In the summer of the same year an epidemic broke out and devastated the Athenians. The exact identity of the disease is uncertain; typhus or typhoid fever are suspected, but this has been the source of much debate. (Note: Taking into consideration its symptoms, most researchers and scientists now believe that it was typhus or typhoid fever and not cholera, plague or measles.) In any case, the city's plight, caused by the epidemic, triggered a new wave of public uproar, and Pericles was forced to defend himself in an emotional final speech, a rendition of which is presented by Thucydides. This is considered to be a monumental oration, revealing Pericles's virtues but also his bitterness towards his compatriots' ingratitude. Temporarily, he managed to tame the people's resentment and to ride out the storm, but his internal enemies' final bid to undermine him came off; they managed to deprive him of the generalship and to fine him at an amount estimated between 15 and 50 talents. Ancient sources mention Cleon, a rising and dynamic protagonist of the Athenian political scene during the war, as the public prosecutor in Pericles's trial.

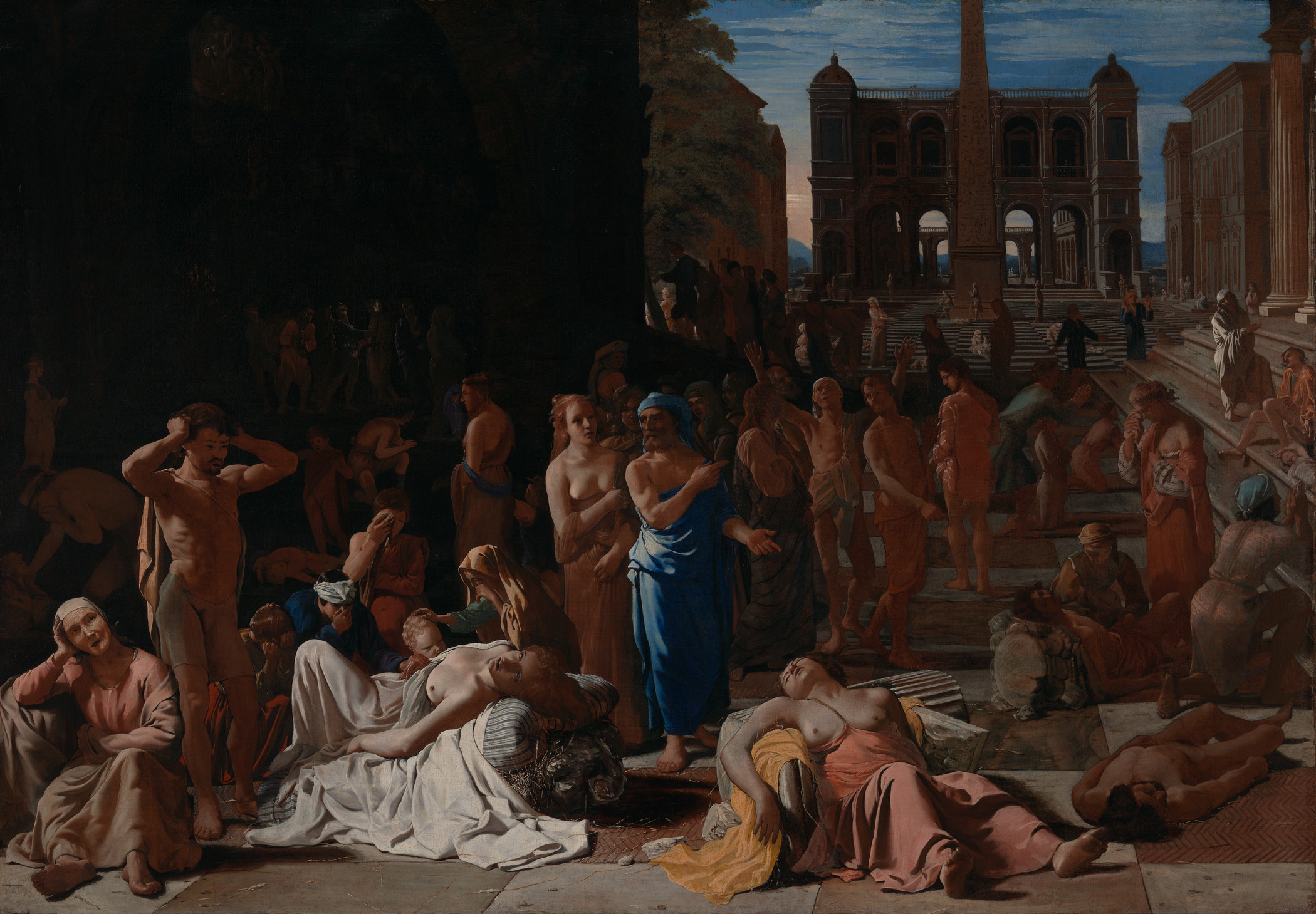
The Plague of Athens (c. 1652–1654) by Michiel Sweerts

Nevertheless, within just a year, in 429 BC, the Athenians not only forgave Pericles but also re-elected him as strategos. (Note: Pericles held the generalship from 444 BC until 430 BC without interruption.) He was reinstated in command of the Athenian army and led all its military operations during 429 BC, having once again under his control the levers of power. In that year, however, Pericles witnessed in the epidemic the death of both Paralus and Xanthippus, his legitimate sons from his first wife. According to Plutarch, Pericles was overwhelmed with grief and wept copiously for his loss. He himself died of the plague later in the year.

Just before his death, Pericles's friends were concentrated around his bed, enumerating his virtues during peace and underscoring his nine war trophies. Pericles, though moribund, heard them and interrupted them, pointing out that they forgot to mention his fairest and greatest title to their admiration; "for", said he, "no living Athenian ever put on mourning because of me". Pericles lived during the first two and a half years of the Peloponnesian War and, according to Thucydides, his death was a disaster for Athens, since his successors were inferior to him; they preferred to incite all the bad habits of the rabble and followed an unstable policy, endeavouring to be popular rather than useful. With these bitter comments, Thucydides not only laments the loss of a man he admired, but he also heralds the flickering of Athens's unique glory and grandeur.

Pausanias (c. 150 AD) records (I.29) seeing the tomb of Pericles along a road near the Academy.

== Personal life ==
Pericles, following Athenian custom, was first married to one of his closest relatives, with whom he had two sons, Paralus and Xanthippus, but around 445 BC, Pericles divorced his wife. He offered her to another husband, with the agreement of her male relatives. The name of his first wife is not known; the only information about her is that she was the wife of Hipponicus, before being married to Pericles, and the mother of Callias from this first marriage.

After Pericles divorced his wife, he had a long-term relationship with Aspasia of Miletus, with whom he had a son, Pericles the Younger. While Aspasia was held in high regard by many of Athens's socialites, her status as a non-Athenian led many to attack their relationship. Even Pericles's son, Xanthippus, who had political ambitions, did not hesitate to slander his father. Nonetheless, such objections did not greatly undermine the popularity of the couple and Pericles readily fought back against accusations that his relationship with Aspasia was corrupting of Athenian society.

His sister and both his legitimate sons, Xanthippus and Paralus, died during the Plague of Athens. Just before his death, the Athenians allowed a change in the law of 451 BC that made his half-Athenian son with Aspasia, Pericles the Younger, a citizen, and legitimate heir, a striking decision considering that Pericles himself had proposed the law confining citizenship to those of Athenian parentage on both sides.

Pericles also acted as guardian to Alcibiades, a young distant relative, after the death of Alcibiades's father, Cleinias, at the Battle of Coronea in 447 BC.

== Assessments ==
Pericles marked a whole era and inspired conflicting judgments about his significant decisions. The fact that he was at the same time a vigorous statesman, general and orator only tends to make an objective assessment of his actions more difficult.

=== Political leadership ===
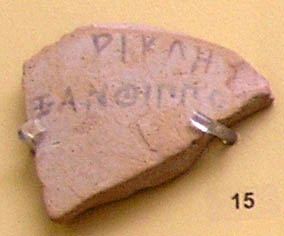
An ostracon with Pericles's name written on it (c. 444–443 BC), Museum of the ancient Agora of Athens

Some contemporary scholars call Pericles a populist, a demagogue and a hawk, while other scholars admire his charismatic leadership. According to Plutarch, after assuming the leadership of Athens, "he was no longer the same man as before, nor alike submissive to the people and ready to yield and give in to the desires of the multitude as a steersman to the breezes". It is told that when his political opponent, Thucydides, was asked by Sparta's king, Archidamus, whether he or Pericles was the better fighter, Thucydides answered without any hesitation that Pericles was better, because even when he was defeated, he managed to convince the audience that he had won. In matters of character, Pericles was above reproach in the eyes of the ancient historians, since "he kept himself untainted by corruption, although he was not altogether indifferent to money-making".

Thucydides (the historian), an admirer of Pericles, maintains that Athens was "in name a democracy but, in fact, governed by its first citizen". Through this comment, the historian illustrates what he perceives as Pericles's charisma to lead, convince and, sometimes, to manipulate. Although Thucydides mentions the fining of Pericles, he does not mention the accusations against Pericles but instead focuses on Pericles's integrity. (Note: Vlachos criticises the historian for this omission and maintains that Thucydides's admiration for the Athenian statesman makes him ignore not only the well-grounded accusations against him but also the mere gossips, namely the allegation that Pericles had corrupted the volatile rabble, so as to assert himself.) On the other hand, in one of his dialogues, Plato rejects the glorification of Pericles and declares: "as I know, Pericles made the Athenians slothful, garrulous and avaricious, by starting the system of public fees". Plutarch mentions other criticism of Pericles's leadership: "many others say that the people were first led on by him into allotments of public lands, festival-grants, and distributions of fees for public services, thereby falling into bad habits, and becoming luxurious and wanton under the influence of his public measures, instead of frugal and self-sufficing".

Thucydides argues that Pericles "was not carried away by the people, but he was the one guiding the people". His judgement is not unquestioned; some 20th-century critics, such as Malcolm F. McGregor and John S. Morrison, proposed that he may have been a charismatic public face acting as an advocate on the proposals of advisors, or the people themselves. According to King, by increasing the power of the people, the Athenians left themselves with no authoritative leader. During the Peloponnesian War, Pericles's dependence on popular support to govern was obvious.

=== Military achievements ===
For more than 20 years Pericles led many expeditions, mainly naval ones. Being always cautious, he never undertook of his own accord a battle involving much uncertainty and peril and he did not accede to the "vain impulses of the citizens". He based his military policy on Themistocles's principle that Athens's predominance depends on its superior naval power and believed that the Peloponnesians were near-invincible on land. Pericles also tried to minimise the advantages of Sparta by rebuilding the walls of Athens, which, it has been suggested, radically altered the use of force in Greek international relations.

During the Peloponnesian War, Pericles initiated a defensive "grand strategy" whose aim was the exhaustion of the enemy and the preservation of the status quo. According to Platias and Koliopoulos, Athens as the strongest party did not have to beat Sparta in military terms and "chose to foil the Spartan plan for victory". The two basic principles of the "Periclean Grand Strategy" were the rejection of appeasement (in accordance with which he urged the Athenians not to revoke the Megarian Decree) and the avoidance of overextension. (Note: According to Platias and Koliopoulos, the "policy mix" of Pericles was guided by five principles: a) According to Kagan, Pericles's vehement insistence that there should be no diversionary expeditions may well have resulted from the bitter memory of the Egyptian campaign, which he had allegedly supported. His strategy is said to have been "inherently unpopular", but Pericles managed to persuade the Athenian public to follow it. It is for that reason that Hans Delbrück called him one of the greatest statesmen and military leaders in history. Although his countrymen engaged in several aggressive actions soon after his death, Platias and Koliopoulos argue that the Athenians remained true to the larger Periclean strategy of seeking to preserve, not expand, the empire, and did not depart from it until the Sicilian Expedition. For his part, Ben X. de Wet concludes his strategy would have succeeded had he lived longer.

Critics of Pericles's strategy, however, have been just as numerous as its supporters. A common criticism is that Pericles was always a better politician and orator than strategist. Donald Kagan called the Periclean strategy "a form of wishful thinking that failed", Barry S. Strauss and Josiah Ober have stated that "as strategist he was a failure and deserves a share of the blame for Athens' great defeat", and Victor Davis Hanson believes that Pericles had not worked out a clear strategy for an effective offensive action that could possibly force Thebes or Sparta to stop the war. Kagan criticises the Periclean strategy on four counts: first that by rejecting minor concessions it brought about war; second, that it was unforeseen by the enemy and hence lacked credibility; third, that it was too feeble to exploit any opportunities; and fourth, that it depended on Pericles for its execution and thus was bound to be abandoned after his death. Kagan estimates Pericles's expenditure on his military strategy in the Peloponnesian War to be about 2,000 talents annually, and based on this figure concludes that he would have only enough money to keep the war going for three years. He asserts that since Pericles must have known about these limitations he probably planned for a much shorter war. Others, such as Donald W. Knight, conclude that the strategy was too defensive and would not succeed.

In contrast, Platias and Koliopoulos reject these criticisms and state that "the Athenians lost the war only when they dramatically reversed the Periclean grand strategy that explicitly disdained further conquests". Hanson stresses that the Periclean strategy was not innovative, but could lead to a stagnancy in favour of Athens. It is a popular conclusion that those succeeding him lacked his abilities and character.

=== Oratorical skill ===
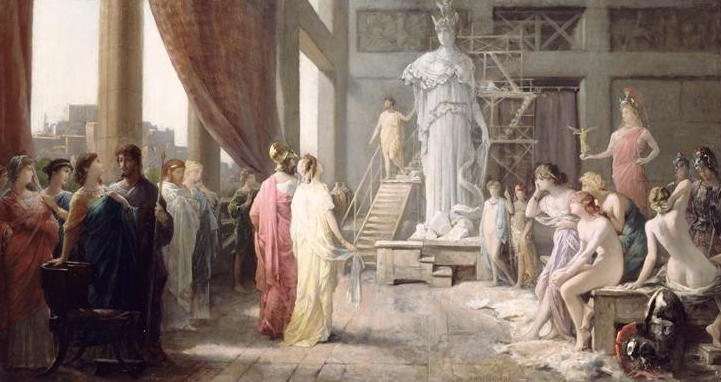
A painting by Hector Leroux (1682–1740), which portrays Pericles and Aspasia, admiring the gigantic statue of Athena in Phidias's studio

Modern commentators of Thucydides, with other modern historians and writers, take varying stances on the issue of how much of the speeches of Pericles, as given by this historian, do actually represent Pericles's own words and how much of them is free literary creation or paraphrase by Thucydides. (Note: According to Vlachos, Thucydides must have been about 30 years old when Pericles delivered his Funeral Oration and he was probably among the audience.) Since Pericles never wrote down or distributed his orations, (Note: Vlachos points out that he does not know who wrote the oration, but "these were the words which should have been spoken at the end of 431 BC". According to Sir Richard C. Jebb, the Thucydidean speeches of Pericles give the general ideas of Pericles with essential fidelity; it is possible, further, that they may contain recorded sayings of his "but it is certain that they cannot be taken as giving the form of the statesman's oratory". John F. Dobson believes that "though the language is that of the historian, some of the thoughts may be those of the statesman". C.M.J. Sicking argues that "we are hearing the voice of real Pericles", while Ioannis T. Kakridis claims that the Funeral Oration is an almost exclusive creation of Thucydides, since "the real audience does not consist of the Athenians of the beginning of the war, but of the generation of 400 BC, which suffers under the repercussions of the defeat". Gomme disagrees with Kakridis, insisting on his belief to the reliability of Thucydides.) no historians are able to answer this with certainty; Thucydides recreated three of them from memory and, thereby, it cannot be ascertained that he did not add his own notions and thoughts. (Note: That is what Plutarch predicates. Nonetheless, according to the 10th century encyclopaedia Suda, Pericles constituted the first orator who systematically wrote down his orations. Cicero speaks about Pericles's writings, but his remarks are not regarded as credible. Most probably, other writers used his name.)

Although Pericles was a main source of his inspiration, some historians have noted that the passionate and idealistic literary style of the speeches Thucydides attributes to Pericles is completely at odds with Thucydides's own cold and analytical writing style. (Note: Ioannis Kalitsounakis argues that "no reader can overlook the sumptuous rythme of the Funeral Oration as a whole and the singular correlation between the impetuous emotion and the marvellous style, attributes of speech that Thucydides ascribes to no other orator but Pericles". According to Harvey Ynis, Thucydides created the Pericles's indistinct rhetorical legacy that has dominated ever since.) This might, however, be the result of the incorporation of the genre of rhetoric into the genre of historiography. That is to say, Thucydides could simply have used two different writing styles for two different purposes.

Ioannis Kakridis and Arnold Gomme were two scholars who debated the originality of Pericles's oratory and last speech. Kakridis believes that Thucydides altered Pericles words. Some of his strongest arguments included in the Introduction of the speech, (Thuc.11.35). Kakridis proposes that it is impossible to imagine Pericles deviating away from the expected funeral orator addressing the mourning audience of 430 after the Peloponnesian war. The two groups addressed were the ones who were prepared to believe him when he praised the dead, and the ones who did not. Gomme rejects Kakridis's position, defending the fact that "Nobody of men has ever been so conscious of envy and its workings as the Greeks, and that the Greeks and Thucydides in particular had a passion for covering all ground in their generalizations, not always relevantly."

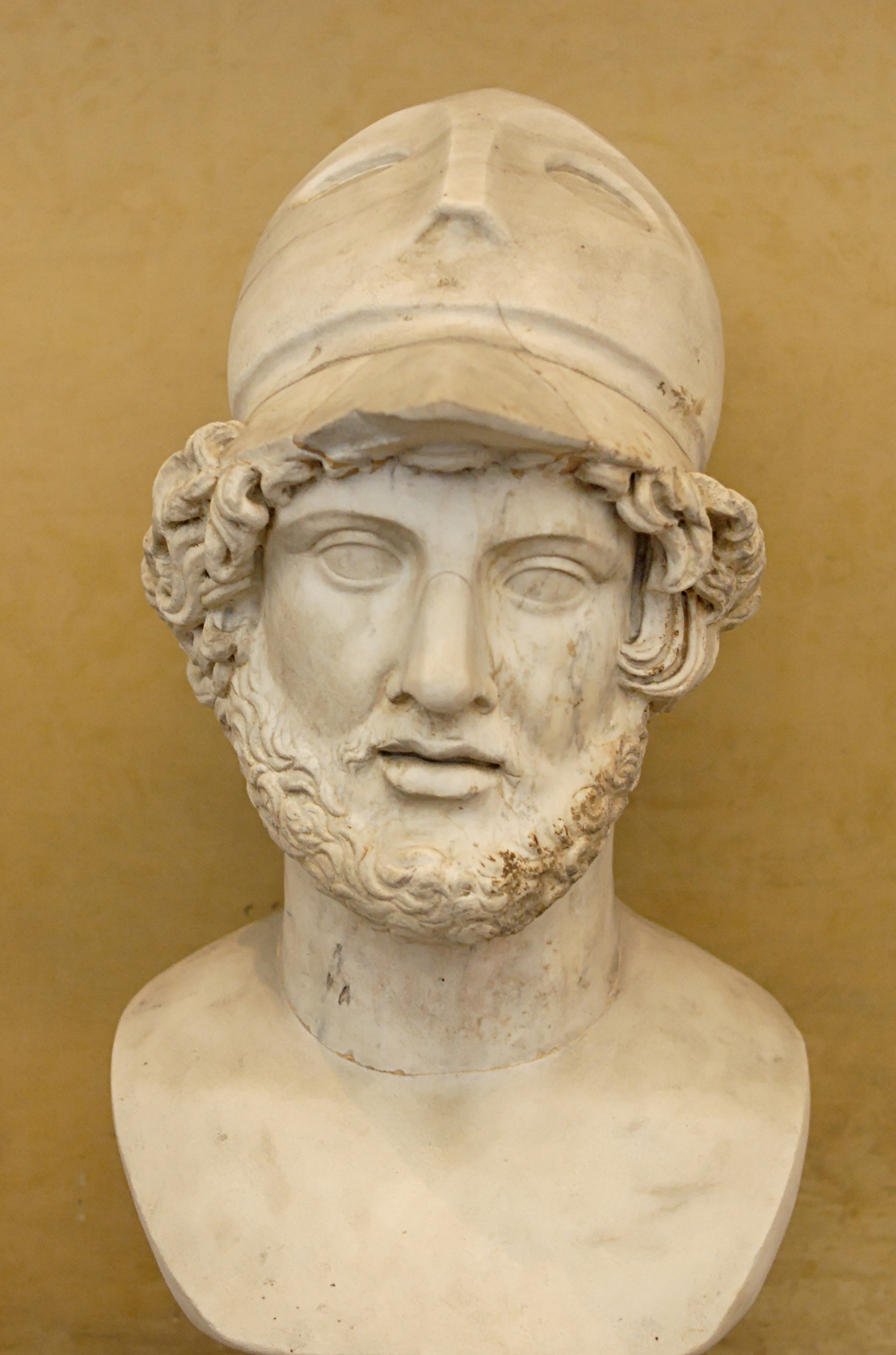
Marble bust of Pericles with the Corinthian helmet, Roman copy of a Greek original, Museo Chiaramonti, Vatican Museums

Kagan states that Pericles adopted "an elevated mode of speech, free from the vulgar and knavish tricks of mob-orators" and, according to Diodorus Siculus, he "excelled all his fellow citizens in skill of oratory". According to Plutarch, he avoided using gimmicks in his speeches, unlike the passionate Demosthenes, and always spoke in a calm and tranquil manner. The biographer points out, however, that the poet Ion reported that Pericles's speaking style was "a presumptuous and somewhat arrogant manner of address, and that into his haughtiness there entered a good deal of disdain and contempt for others".

Gorgias, in Plato's homonymous dialogue, uses Pericles as an example of powerful oratory. In Menexenus, however, Socrates (through Plato) casts aspersions on Pericles's rhetorical fame, claiming ironically that, since Pericles was educated by Aspasia, a trainer of many orators, he would be superior in rhetoric to someone educated by Antiphon. He also attributes authorship of the Funeral Oration to Aspasia and attacks his contemporaries' veneration of Pericles.

Sir Richard C. Jebb concludes that "unique as an Athenian statesman, Pericles must have been in two respects unique also as an Athenian orator; first, because he occupied such a position of personal ascendancy as no man before or after him attained; secondly, because his thoughts and his moral force won him such renown for eloquence as no one else ever got from Athenians".

Ancient Greek writers call Pericles "Olympian" and extol his talents; referring to him "thundering and lightning and exciting Greece" and carrying the weapons of Zeus when orating. According to Quintilian, Pericles would always prepare assiduously for his orations and, before going on the rostrum, he would always pray to the gods, so as not to utter any improper word.

=== Pericles and the city gods ===
Nothing was more alien to the Greeks than the notion of a separation between church and state. In Athens, the community provided a tight framework for religious manifestations while, symmetrically, religion was deeply embedded in civic life. Within this context, participation in the rituals was an action highly political in the broadest sense of the term.

To analyse Pericles's relations with gods, one has to position oneself at the intersection of the general and the particular, where what was personal and what was shared by the whole community came together. On the one hand, the career of the strategos will illuminate the Athenians' collective relationship to all that was divine. As a reelected strategos and a persuasive orator, Pericles was the spokesman of a civic religion that was undergoing a mutation. He was implicated in a policy of making constant offerings and of launching huge architectural religious works not only on the Acropolis but also throughout Attica; and, furthermore, he was engaged in such activities at a time when city was introducing profound changes into its religious account of its origins—that is, autochthony—within a context of strained diplomatic relations.

On the other hand, the ancient sources made it possible to glimpse the personal relations that Pericles had developed with gods. These were relations of proximity in the first place: he was sometimes depicted as a protégé of goddess Athena, but in Attic comedies he was also assimilated to god Zeus, in an analogy that was in no way flattering. But then, there were also relations that emphasized distance: some philosophical accounts presented him as a man close to the sophists or even as a freethinker. Finally, there were relations involving irreverence: some later and less trustworthy sources made much of several trials for impiety in which those close to him were involved, and this raises the question of religious tolerance in fifth-century Athens and, in particular, how far individuals enjoyed freedom of thought when faced with the civic community.

== Legacy ==
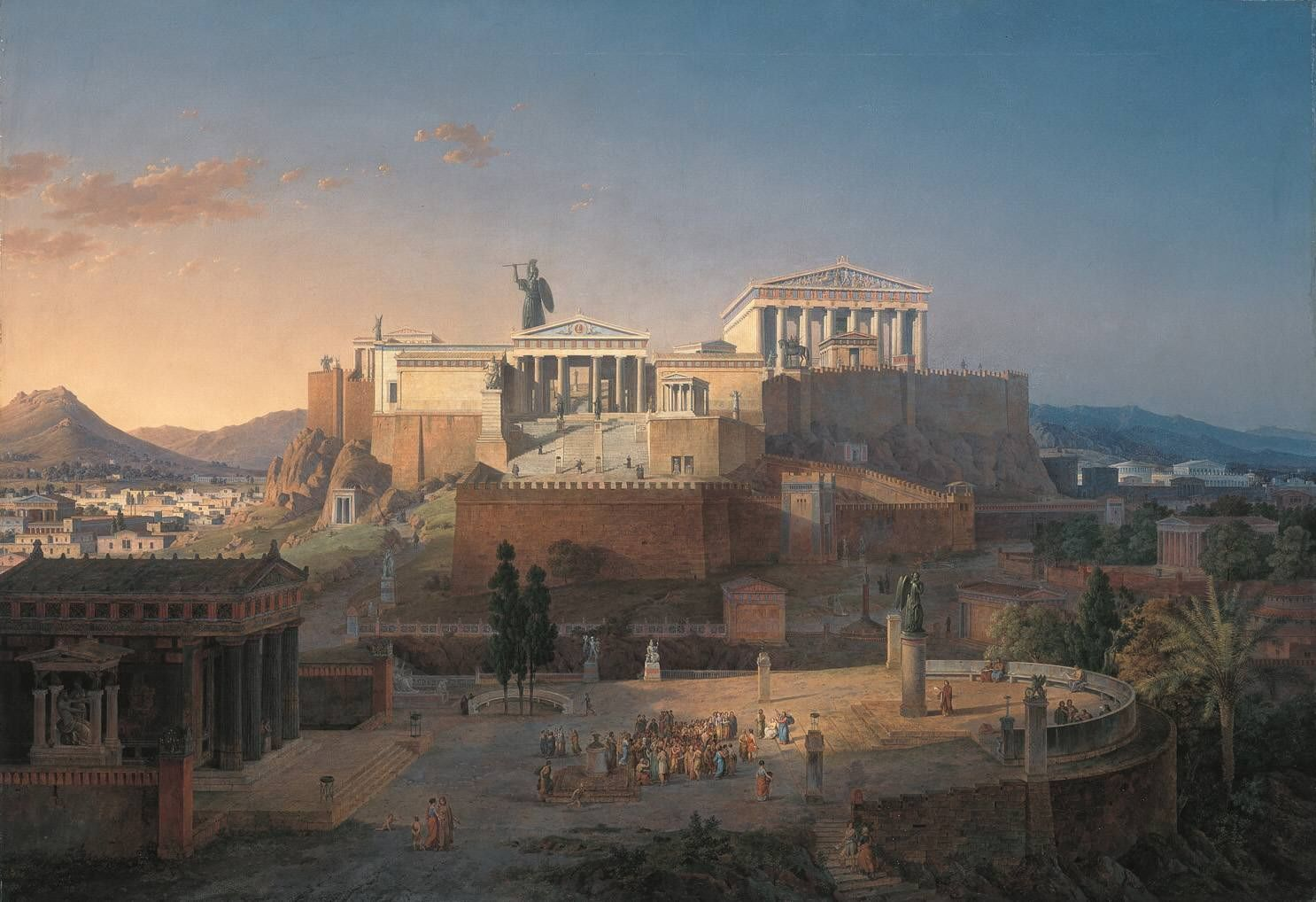
The Acropolis at Athens (1846) by Leo von Klenze

Pericles's most visible legacy can be found in the literary and artistic works of the Golden Age, much of which survive to this day. The Acropolis, though in ruins, still stands and is a symbol of modern Athens. Paparrigopoulos wrote that these masterpieces are "sufficient to render the name of Greece immortal in our world".

In politics, Victor L. Ehrenberg argues that a basic element of Pericles's legacy is Athenian imperialism, which denies true democracy and freedom to the people of all but the ruling state. The promotion of such an arrogant imperialism is said to have ruined Athens. Pericles and his "expansionary" policies have been at the centre of arguments promoting democracy in oppressed countries.

Other analysts maintain an Athenian humanism illustrated in the Golden Age. The freedom of expression is regarded as the lasting legacy deriving from this period. Pericles is lauded as "the ideal type of the perfect statesman in ancient Greece" and his Funeral Oration is nowadays synonymous with the struggle for participatory democracy and civic pride.

In 1932, botanist Albert Charles Smith published Periclesia, a monotypic genus of flowering plants from Ecuador belonging to the family Ericaceae and named after Pericles.

== See also ==
- Art in ancient Greece
- Culture of Greece
- Sculpture of ancient Greece
- Timeline of ancient Greece
- Pericles, Prince of Tyre
