= Xanthippus (father of Pericles) =

Athenian politician, father of Pericles (c.525–475 BC)

- Ξάνθιππος
- Born: c. 525 BC; Athens, Greece
- Died: c. 475 BC (aged c. 50)
- Spouse: Agariste
- Children: Pericles
- Relatives: Ariphron (father)
- Military career
- Allegiance: Athens
- Service years: 490 – 479 BC
- Rank: Strategos
- Conflicts: First Persian invasion of Greece Battle of Marathon Second Persian invasion of Greece Battle of Mycale Siege of Sestos

Xanthippus (/zænˈθɪpəs/; Greek: Ξάνθιππος, pronounced [ksán.tʰip.pos]; c. 520 – 475 BC) was a wealthy Athenian politician and general during the Greco-Persian Wars. He was the son of Ariphron and father of Pericles, both prominent Athenian statesmen. A marriage to Agariste, niece of Cleisthenes, linked Xanthippus with the Alcmaeonid clan, whose aristocratic interests he often represented in government. He was ostracized in 484 BC, likely arising from his rivalry with Themistocles, but he was recalled from exile when the Persians invaded Greece. He commanded the Athenian fleets in the Battle of Mycale and the Siege of Sestos. It is possible that he participated in the Battle of Marathon and Battle of Salamis.

== Early life ==
Little is known of Xanthippus' personal or early life. He was likely born by 520 BC. His name means "Yellow Horse." Hailing from an aristocratic family, Xanthippus probably received an education in literacy, numeracy, and civic engagement. His father Ariphron was likely a partisan of Pisistratus and owned property that Xanthippus would inherit. No later than 496 BC Xanthippus married Agariste of the Alcmaeonid clan, a wealthy and influential Athenian family, who gave birth to their son Pericles around 495 BC.

== Political career ==
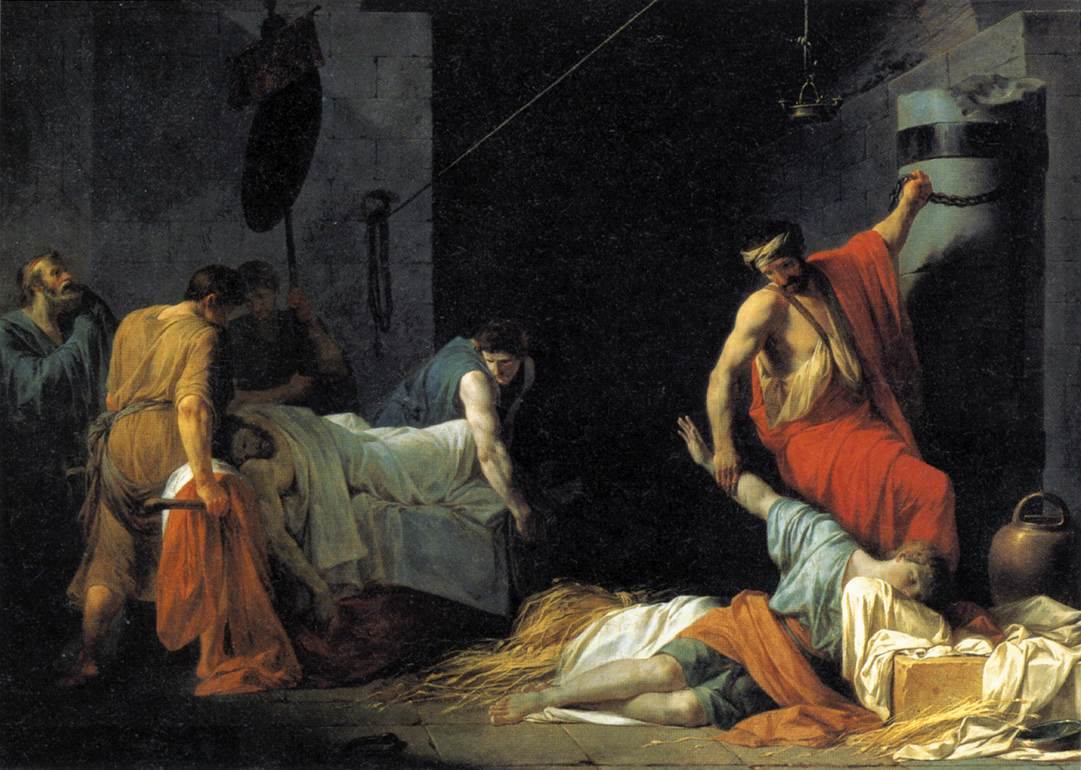
Jean-François Pierre Peyron. The Funeral of Miltiades, 1782, Louvre Museum. Xanthippus prosecuted Miltiades in 489 BC, leading to his imprisonment.

As a citizen-soldier of Athens and a member of the aristocracy, Xanthippus likely fought during the Battle of Marathon in 490 BC. He first appears in historical record the following year (489 BC), heading the prosecution of Miltiades the Younger, the general who had contributed to Athenian victory at Marathon. Miltiades had asked for a fleet of 70 ships and a supply of troops to be put at his disposal in reward for his victory, saying that he would not reveal his intentions, but that the venture would generate profit for the city. The Athenians granted his wish, but he met with set-backs during an attack on Paros and had to return empty handed and wounded. Many Athenians suspected him of treason. The Alcmaeonidae were traditional political rivals of Miltiades' clan, the Philaidae, and they pressed for charges against the general, with Xanthippus making their case and asking for the death penalty. As Miltiades was in great pain due to injuries and could not defend himself, his allies argued on his behalf and managed to avoid his execution. Instead, he was fined a sum too large to pay and imprisoned as a debtor. In prison he died of his wounds, and his son, Cimon, would pay the fine on his behalf. Immediately following the trial Xanthippus was distinguished by the Athenians for his actions, though the incident would remain politically attached to him.

In the Constitution of Athens, Aristotle claimed that "Xanthippus was at the head of the people, while Miltiades represented the upper classes," placing him in the ideological trail of Solon, Pisistratus, and Cleisthenes.

=== Ostracism ===
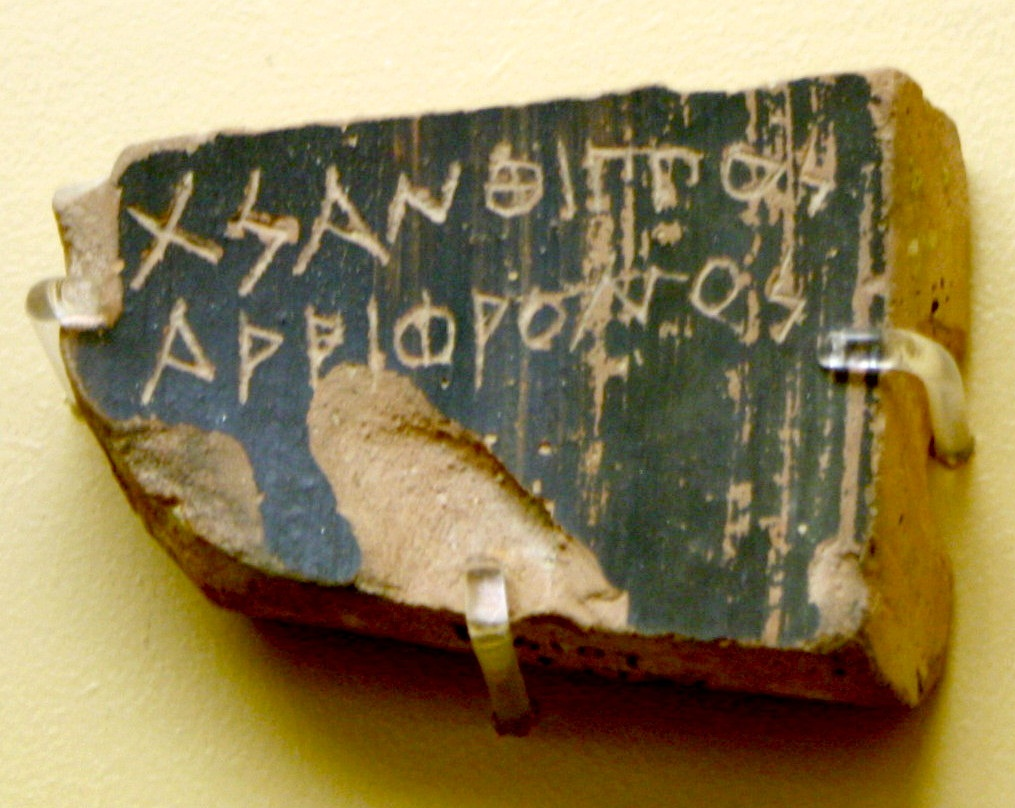
Ostrakon naming Xanthippus (484 BC). Stoa of Attalus, Ancient Agora Museum in Athens.

Xanthippus' leadership was short lived due to his ostracism in 484 BC. Xanthippus allied with his fellow aristocrat Aristides to counter the ambitions of Themistocles. Around the year 480 BC, the names of Xanthippus and Aristides would come to be invoked in songs critiquing "the liar, the cheat, and traitor" Themistocles, who Plutarch claimed played a hand in a series of ostracisms that removed the pair from Athens. Named after the ostrakon shards that votes would be cast on, should a quorum of 6,000 votes be cast in an ostracism, the man whose name received the most votes would be exiled for ten years, upon which time he could return without legal or political ramification. There were 5 prominent ostracisms of aristocrats during the political clashes of the 480s BC, concerned with removing those connected with the tyrant Pisistratus. Xanthippus was the first ostracism not in connection with the tyranny, followed by Aristides. Themistocles was rumored to be involved with both ostracisms. His father's connection to Pisistratus was not noted as a cause.

Ostrakon shards recovered from the western slope of the Areopagus in the 1990s were translated in 2018 and have been attributed to the ostracism vote of 484 BC. Of the surviving 56 ostraka naming Xanthippus, one explains that Xanthippus disrespected the prytaneion. This accusation has been associated with Cylon's attempted coup of Athens between 636 and 632 BC, where Archon Megacles of the Alcmaeonid clan ordered the execution of Cylon's followers who were in the Athenian Acropolis, and was perhaps populated by Themistocles. Another shard claims that Xanthippus, "curse of the leaders, has been especially harmful," likely referencing his prosecution of Miltiades.

== Second Persian invasion of Greece ==
The Persians returned to attack Greece in 480 BC, and Themistocles and Athens recalled both Xanthippus and Aristides to aid in the defence of the city. The city of Athens had to be abandoned to protect its citizens and Plutarch relates a folk tale about Xanthippus' dog, who had been left behind by his master when the Athenians embarked for the safety of the Island of Salamis. In the story, out of loyalty the dog jumped into the sea and swam after Xanthippus' boat, managing to swim across to the isle before dying of exhaustion. In Plutarch's day there was still a place on Salamis called "the dog's grave."

Xanthippus at least witnessed, if not fought in, the Battle of Salamis in 480 BC, which forced back the Persian offensive and boosted the reputation of the Athenians amongst the Greeks. Xanthippus was elected to the position of eponymous archon the following year (479/478 BC). At that time a large force of Persian infantry still remained in Greece and Athens remained engaged. He additionally succeeded Themistocles as commander of the Athenian fleet that year (479/478 BC), while Aristides was given command of the land forces. The ancient Greek historian Diodorus Siculus suggested that the Athenians began to challenge Spartan control of the sea after they were accredited with the victory at Salamis. Allegedly threatened by this, the Spartans awarded Themistocles "with double the number of gifts awarded to those who had received the prize of valour," causing the Athenians to remove him from the role of commander, giving the position to Xanthippus.

=== Battle of Mycale ===
A map showing the position of Mount Mycale in relation to Lade, Samos and Miletus. Made by Eric Gaba.

Xanthippus was the Athenian commander directing naval forces against the Persians off the coast of Lydia in Asia Minor. The remains of the Persian fleet that had survived the Battle of Salamis were stationed at the island of Samos. According to Diodorus Siculus, ambassadors from Samos informed Xanthippus and Leotychidas, representing the Spartans, that the Ionian cities wanted to revolt. The Greeks laid anchor on Delos with 250 triremes who set sail for Samos. When the Persians discovered that they were being pursued by the Greek fleet they abandoned Samos and sailed to the opposite shore, under the slopes of Mount Mycale, where they beached their ships and retreated inland to set up a defensive fort. The Greek forces launched an attack on them, with Xanthippus leading his Athenian contingent on the left flank. Diodorus Siculus alleges that a herald was sent to sail toward the Persians and announce, "The Greeks, having conquered the Persians, are now come to liberate the Greek cities of Asia."

Xanthippus' men allegedly had smoother terrain to cross than the other flank, so they engaged in combat with the Persians first. They broke through the line and the Persian troops returned to their fort. The Athenians were able to breach the wall and the other flank joined them in the attack. Herodotus claims this battle occurred on the same day as the Battle of Plataea, where Aristides led the Athenian contingent under the command of the Spartan Pausanias, and defeated the Persian land-forces. These two decisive battles depleted the Persian fleet and saw the Persian army led by Mardonius defeated, effectively ending the second Persian invasion and Persian control of the Aegean Sea and Ionian city-states.

=== Siege of Sestos ===
After the Battle of Mycale, the combined Greek fleets sailed to the Hellespont to destroy the Persian pontoon bridge at Abydos, but when they discovered it had already been destroyed, the Spartans withdrew and headed home. Xanthippus led the remaining Athenian troops, in addition to the Ionians and Aeolians traveling with the Greeks after Mycale, on an assault upon Sestos in the Thracian Chersonese. It had been captured by the Persians and left under the charge of a Persian governor, Artayctes. Sestos controlled the European side of the Hellespont and all the shipping trade that passed. Since Athens was very dependent upon imported grain, this made trade with the Black Sea of strategic importance and Xanthippus was determined to bring these shipping lanes back under Athenian control. The siege continued into the autumn, breaking in the winter when food ran out in the city. The Athenians took control of the city the next day. Herodotus describes in The Histories that the Athenians, under the command of Xanthippus, stoned Artayctes son to death in front of him, and then Artayctes himself was crucified. That Herodotus ends his account of the Greco-Persian Wars here has led some scholars to imply that the historian wished to conclude on a note that flattered Xanthippus' son, Pericles, who was one of Herodotus' patrons. After, Herodotus claims that Xanthippus and his Athenian troops separated from their allies and returned to Greece with ropes from the Persian bridge to dedicate as offerings in sanctuaries.

== After the Greco-Persian Wars ==
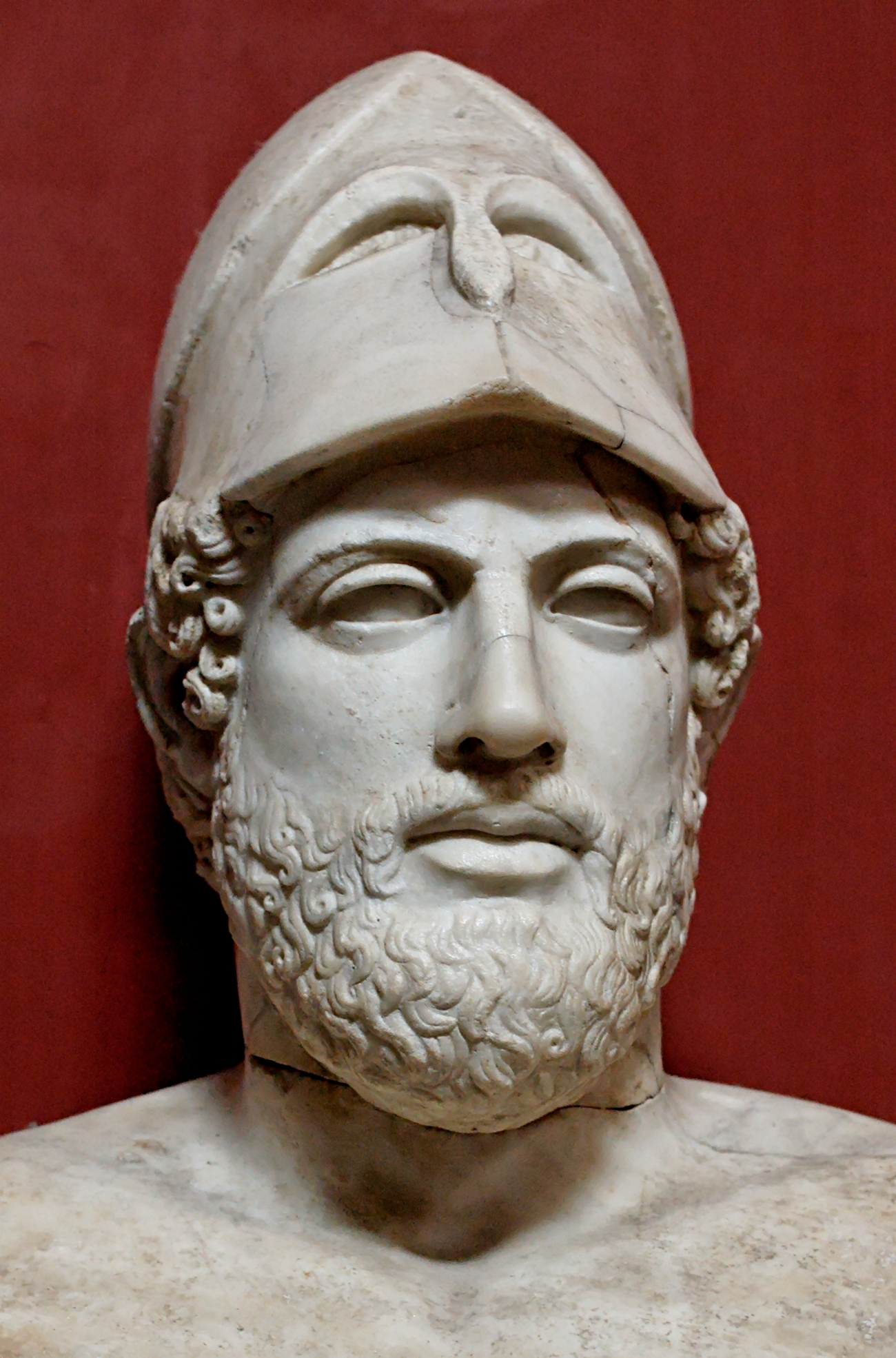
Bust of Pericles bearing the inscription "Pericles, son of Xanthippus, Athenian." Marble, Roman copy after a Greek original from ca. 430 BC. Museo Pio-Clementino, Vatican Museums.

Xanthippus died several years after his return to Athens, possibly in the mid-470s BC. He was deceased by 473/2 BC, when his son, Pericles, served as choregos for Aeschylus and was described as "his own master."

Xanthippus would be remembered for his leadership in the Battle of Mycale and the Siege of Sestos. In Pausanius' Description of Greece from the 2nd century AD, he recounts that on the Athenian Acropolis there was a statue of Xanthippus, "who fought against the Persians at the naval battle of Mycale." He claims the statue was placed near the likeness of the poet Anacreon of Teos. While the dates for the monuments are unsure, it has been suggested that Pericles erected the statue in the immediate aftermath of the Greco-Persian Wars. "Apart" from Xanthippus was a solitary statue of Pericles.

=== Pericles, son of Xanthippus ===
Pericles would become a prominent Athenian statesmen himself, leading Athens from roughly 461 to 429 BC. He was a general from 444 BC until 430 BC, commanding Athenian troops in the beginning of the Peloponnesian War. Thucydides remarked, referring to Pericles, that Athens was "in name a democracy but, in fact, governed by its first citizen." From his first marriage, Pericles named one of his legitimate sons Xanthippus.

== Bibliography ==
- Abbott, Evelyn. Pericles and the Golden Age of Athens. New York City, NY: G. P. Putnam's Sons, 1891.
- Aristotle, Constitution of Athens. English Trans. by H. Rackham, Aristotle in 23 Volumes, Vol. 20. Cambridge, MA: Harvard University Press. ; London: William Heinemann, 1952. Perseus Digital Library: https://www.perseus.tufts.edu/hopper/text?doc=Perseus%3Atext%3A1999.01.0046%3Achapter%3D1.
- Barron, J. P. "The Liberation of Greece," in The Cambridge Ancient History, 2nd Ed., edited by Boardman, John, N. G. L. Hammond, D. M. Lewis, and M. Ostwald. Cambridge: Cambridge University Press, 1988. pp. 592–622.
- Diodorus Siculus, Library. Diodorus of Sicily in Twelve Volumes, Vol. 4-8, English Trans. by C.H. Oldfather. Cambridge, MA: Harvard University Press. ; London: William Heinemann, 1989. Perseus Digital Library: https://www.perseus.tufts.edu/hopper/text?doc=Perseus:text:1999.01.0084.
- Evans, Richard. “The Battle of Mycale (479 BC). A Fitting Climax to Herodotus’ History or Just a Brawl on the Beach?” Nuova Antologia Militare 5, No. 18. 2024. pp. 53–82. doi:10.36158/97888929588453
- Fornara, Charles W. and Loren J. Samons II. Athens from Cleisthenes to Pericles. Berkeley: University of California Press, 1991.
- Herodotus, The Histories, English Trans. by A.D. Godley. Cambridge: Harvard University Press, 1920. Perseus Digital Library: https://www.perseus.tufts.edu/hopper/text?doc=Perseus:text:1999.01.0126.
- Lamartine Snyder, William. The Military Annals of Greece from the Earliest Time to the Beginning of the Peloponnesian War, Vol. 1. Boston: R. G. Badger, 1915.
- Lytton, Edward Bulwer, and Oswyn Murray. Athens : Its Rise and Fall ; with Views of the Literature, Philosophy, and Social Life of the Athenian People. London: Routledge, 2004.
- Morgan, T.J. "Literate education in classical Athens," The Classical Quarterly, Vol. 49, Issue 1. May 1999. pp. 47–50. doi:10.1093/cq/49.1.46
- Paparrigopoulos, Konstantinos, edited by Pavlos Karolidis. History of the Hellenic Nation, Vol. AB. Eleftheroudakis, 1925.
- Pausanius, Description of Greece, English Trans. by W.H.S. Jones and H.A. Ormerod. Cambridge, MA: Harvard University Press. ; London: WIlliam Heinemann, 1918. Perseus Digital Library: https://www.perseus.tufts.edu/hopper/text?doc=Perseus%3Atext%3A1999.01.0160%3Abook%3D1%3Achapter%3D1%3Asection%3D1.
- Plutarch, "Comparison of Aristides and Marcus Cato," in Plutarch's Lives, English Trans. by Bernadotte Perrin. Cambridge, MA: Harvard University Press. ; London: William Heinemann, 1914. Perseus Digital Library: https://www.perseus.tufts.edu/hopper/text?doc=Perseus%3Atext%3A2008.01.0022.
- Plutarch, "Life of Pericles," in Plutarch's Lives, English Trans. by Berdadotte Perrin. Cambridge, MA: Harvard University Press. ; London: William Heinemann, 1916. Perseus Digital Library: https://www.perseus.tufts.edu/hopper/text?doc=Perseus%3Atext%3A2008.01.0055.
- Plutarch, "Marcus Cato" in Plutarch's Lives, English Trans. by Bernadotte Perrin. Cambridge, MA: Harvard University Press. ; London: William Heinemann, 1914. Perseus Digital Library: https://www.perseus.tufts.edu/hopper/text?doc=Perseus%3Atext%3A2008.01.0013%3Achapter%3D1%3Asection%3D1.
- Plutarch, "Life of Themistocles" in Plutarch's Lives, English Trans. by Berdadotte Perrin. Cambridge, MA: Harvard University Press. ; London: William Heinemann, 1914. Perseus Digital Library: https://www.perseus.tufts.edu/hopper/text?doc=Perseus%3Atext%3A2008.01.0066.
- Ridgway, Brunilde Sismondo. “An Issue of Methodology: Anakreon, Perikles, Xanthippos.” American Journal of Archaeology, Vol. 102, No. 4 (1998), pp. 717–38. JSTOR: doi:10.2307/506097 Accessed 2 June 2025.
- Roebuck, C. "Trade" in The Cambridge Ancient History. Edited by John Boardman, N. G. L. Hammond, and M. Ostwald, Cambridge University Press, 1988. pp. 446–460. doi:10.1017/CHOL9780521228046.018
- John Boardman, N. G. L. Hammond, D. M. Lewis, M. OstwaldSacks, David, Lisa R. Brody, and Oswyn Murray. Encyclopedia of the Ancient Greek World. New York City, NY: Infobase Publishing, 2009. ISBN 978-0-8160-5722-1
- Smith, William. A Dictionary of Greek and Roman Biography and Mythology, Vol. 3. London, UK: 1864. Internet Archive: https://archive.org/details/in.ernet.dli.2015.236206.
- Thucydides, History of the Peloponnesian War. English Trans. by Thomas Hobbes of Malmesbury. London: Bohn, 1843. Perseus Digital Library: https://www.perseus.tufts.edu/hopper/text?doc=Perseus%3Atext%3A1999.01.0247%3Abook%3Dintro%3Achapter%3D1.
- Tracy, Stephen V. Pericles: A Sourcebook and Reader. Berkeley, CA: University of California Press, 2009.
- Węcowski, Marek. Athenian Ostracism and its Original Purpose. London, UK: Oxford University Press, 2022. ISBN 978-0-19-258755-8
- Zerbinati, Martina. "L’ostracismo di Santippo, figlio di Arrifrone, «il più colpevole tra i pritani sacrileghi». Alcune riflessioni alla luce di recenti scoperte archeologiche." Erga-Logoi, Vol. 6, No. 2. Italy: LED Edizioni Universitarie, 2018. pp. 29–49. doi:10.7358/erga-2018-002-zerb LED Online: https://www.ledonline.it/index.php/Erga-Logoi/article/view/1349.
