= Sestos =

Ancient city in Thrace

- Σηστός (Ancient Greek)

- Location within Marmara
- 40°13′58″N 26°25′21″E
- Type: Settlement
- Location: Akbaş Kalesi, Çanakkale Province, Turkey
- Region: Thrace

History
- Built: c. 600 BC

Site notes
- Public access: Restricted

Sestos (Greek: Σηστός, Latin: Sestus) was an ancient city in Thrace. It was located at the Thracian Chersonese peninsula on the European coast of the Hellespont, opposite the ancient city of Abydos, and near the town of Eceabat in Turkey.

In Greek mythology, Sestos is presented in the myth of Hero and Leander as the home of Hero.

== History ==
=== Classical period ===
The environs of Sestos in Antiquity

Sestos is first mentioned in Homer's Iliad as a Thracian settlement, and was allied with Troy during the Trojan War. The city was settled by colonists from Lesbos in c. 600 BC. In c. 512, Sestos was occupied by the Achaemenid Empire, and Darius I ferried across from the city to Asia Minor after his Scythian campaign. Alongside Byzantium, Sestos was considered to be one of the foremost Achaemenid ports on the European coast of the Bosphorus and the Hellespont. In 480, at the onset of the Second Persian invasion of Greece, Xerxes I bridged the Hellespont near Sestos.

In 479 BC, after the Greek victory at the Battle of Mycale, Sestos was besieged by Athenian forces led by Xanthippus. The Greek siege was resisted by a joint force of Persian soldiers and the city's native inhabitants and endured the whole winter, however, food supplies were inadequate as the siege was unexpected, and the city's garrison suffered from famine. The garrison subsequently capitulated and the Persian soldiers were imprisoned. Artayctes, the Persian governor of Sestos, had escaped, but was captured and crucified. However, Athenian influence over Sestos lapsed briefly, according to Plutarch, as Cimon retook the city in a second campaign at some point between 478 and 471.

Sestos became a member of the Athenian-led Delian League, and was part of the Hellespontine district. The city contributed a phoros of 500 drachmas annually from 446/445 to 435/434, after which Sestos provided 1000 drachmas until 421/420. At Sestos, a 10 per cent tax was levied on westbound, non-Athenian, merchant grain ships. The city served as a base for the Athenian fleet until it was occupied by Spartan forces led by Lysander in 404, during the Peloponnesian War. Sestos' population was briefly expelled and replaced by Spartan settlers, but the city's native inhabitants were permitted to return to the city soon after.

During the Corinthian War, Sestos was occupied by Athenian forces led by Conon in 393, and the city came under the control of Ariobarzanes, Satrap of Phrygia. In 365, an attack on Sestos by Cotys I, King of Thrace, was repelled with the aid of Timotheus, for which Athens was awarded with Sestos and Krithotai in the same year. A cleruchy was established at Sestos in 364, but the city was conquered by Cotys I after a surprise attack in 360, and a Thracian garrison was established. The Athenian general Chares seized Sestos in 353 and carried out andrapodismos whereby the male population was killed and women and children were enslaved; the city was repopulated by Athenian cleruchs.

=== Hellenistic period ===
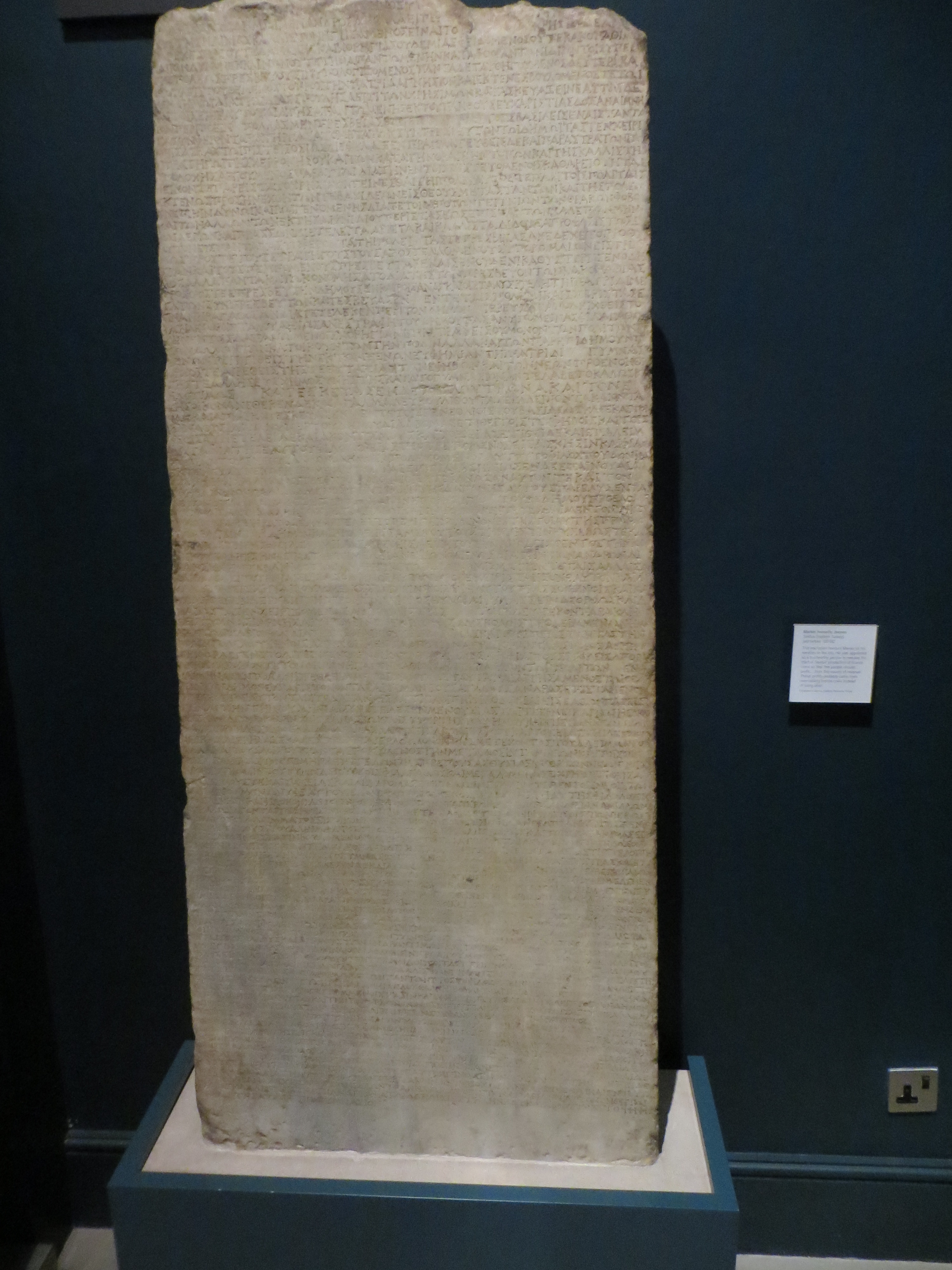
Decree from Sestos during the Hellenistic period in the British Museum

Sestos remained under Athenian control until the Peace of 337 and dissolution of the Second Athenian League, after which Sestos joined the Macedonian-led League of Corinth. Alexander the Great, King of Macedonia, crossed over from Sestos to Asia Minor in 334 BC. After the death of Alexander the Great in 323, the city, alongside other Macedonian dependencies in Thrace, was allocated to Lysimachus as a result of the Partition of Babylon. The mint of Sestos was established in c. 300 BC. Lysimachus retained control of the city until his death at the battle of Corupedium in 281.

The city was seized by Philip V, King of Macedonia, in 200 BC, and remained under Macedonian control until the conclusion of the Second Macedonian War in 196 with the Peace of Flamininus, which proclaimed Sestos a free city. In 196 BC, during the Roman–Seleucid War, Sestos surrendered to Antiochus III, Megas Basileus of the Seleucid Empire, who refortified the city in 191 in preparation for a Roman attack, only for the city to surrender to Gaius Livius Salinator in 190. At the end of the war, the Treaty of Apamea of 188 awarded Sestos to the Kingdom of Pergamon. By the end of the Hellenistic period, the offices of gymnasiarch and of ephebarch, with responsibility for the neoi (young) and epheboi (adolescents), are attested at Sestos.

=== Roman period ===
Upon the death of Attalus III, King of Pergamon, in 133 BC, Sestos was annexed to the Roman Republic after Aristonicus, a pretender to the throne, had been defeated. The city was mentioned in Ptolemy's Canon Urbium Insignium. The mint of Sestos ceased to function in c. 250 AD. It is believed that Sestos, with Abydos and Lampsacus, is referred to as one of the "three large capital cities" of the Roman Empire in Weilüe, a 3rd-century AD Chinese text. Gaius Julius Solinus in Collectanea rerum memorabilium also makes reference to the city.

By late antiquity, the harbour of Sestos had silted up. In 447 AD, Sestos was sacked by the Huns. The city was damaged by an earthquake during the reign of Emperor Zeno in 478 AD. In the 6th century, according to Procopius' De Aedificiis, Emperor Justinian I refortified Sestos.

=== Medieval period ===
It is believed that Sestos is referred to as Ṣāṣah in the Book of Curiosities of the Sciences and Marvels for the Eyes, an 11th-century Arabic treatise. By the 13th century AD, the crossing from Lampsacus to Kallipolis had become more common and largely replaced the crossing from Sestos to Abydos. The fortress on the site of Sestos was later named Choiridokastron (pig castle), and was captured by Ottoman Turks led by Süleyman Pasha in 1355. According to Enveri's Dusturname, Choiridokastron was the first settlement in Europe to be conquered by the Ottoman Turks, whereas Aşıkpaşazade recorded that the fortress was attacked by Ottoman forces, after the fall of Tzympe.

== See also ==
- List of ancient Greek cities

== Bibliography ==
- Bäbler, Balbina (2013). "Thracian Chersonese". Encyclopedia of Ancient Greece, ed. Nigel Wilson. Routledge. pp. 155–156.
- Balcer, Jack Martin (1990). "BYZANTIUM". In Yarshater, Ehsan (ed.). Encyclopædia Iranica. Vol. IV/6: Burial II–Calendars II. London and New York: Routledge & Kegan Paul. pp. 599–600. ISBN 978-0-71009-129-1.
- Bevan, George; Lehoux, Daryn; Talbert, Richard (2013). "Reflectance Transformation Imaging of a 'Byzantine' Portable Sundial". Zeitschrift für Papyrologie und Epigraphik. 187: 221–229.
- Braund, David (2008). "The Emergence of the Hellenistic World". A Companion to the Hellenistic World, ed. Andrew Erskine. Wiley-Blackwell. pp. 19–35.
- Brodersen, Kai (2011). "Mapping Pliny's World: The Achievement of Solinus". Bulletin of the Institute of Classical Studies. 54 (1). Wiley: 63–88. doi:10.1111/j.2041-5370.2011.00017.x.
- Delev, Peter (2015). "From Koroupedion to the Beginning of the Third Mithridatic War". A Companion to Ancient Thrace. John Wiley & Sons. pp. 59–75.
- Dmitriev, Sviatoslav (2005). City Government in Hellenistic and Roman Asia Minor. Oxford University Press.
- Fine, John Van Antwerp (1983). The Ancient Greeks: A Critical History. Harvard University Press.
- Grainger, John D. (1997). A Seleukid Prosopography and Gazetteer. BRILL.
- Inalcik, Halil (1990). "The Ottoman Turks and the Crusades, 1329-1451". A History of the Crusades, vol. 6: The Impact of the Crusades on Europe. University of Wisconsin Press. pp. 222–276.
- Isaac, Benjamin H. (1986). The Greek Settlements in Thrace Until the Macedonian Conquest. BRILL.
- Kahlaoui, Tarek (2017). Creating the Mediterranean: Maps and the Islamic Imagination. BRILL.
- Kazhdan, Alexander (1991). "Kallipolis". In Kazhdan, Alexander (ed.). The Oxford Dictionary of Byzantium. Oxford and New York: Oxford University Press. pp. 1094–1095. ISBN 0-19-504652-8.
- Kelly, Christopher (2011). Attila The Hun: Barbarian Terror and the Fall of the Roman Empire. Random House.
- Krauss, Johannes (1980). Die Inschriften von Sestos und der thrakischen Chersones. Rudolf Habelt. ISBN 3-7749-1750-7.
- Leslie, D. D.; Gardiner, K. J. H. (1995). "All Roads Lead to Rome: Chinese Knowledge of the Roman Empire". Journal of Asian History. 29 (1). Harrassowitz Verlag: 61–81.
- Londey, Peter (2016). "Sestos". Conflict in Ancient Greece and Rome: The Definitive Political, Social, and Military Encyclopedia. ABC-CLIO. p. 492.
- Loukopoulou, Louisa (2004). "Thracian Chersonesos". An Inventory of Archaic and Classical Poleis, ed. Mogens Herman Hansen And Thomas Heine Nielsen. Oxford University Press.
- Mackie, C. J.; Atabay, Mithat; Körpe, Reyhan; Sagona, Antonio (2016). "Boundary and Divide: The Antiquity of the Dardanelles". Anzac Battlefield: A Gallipoli Landscape of War and Memory. Cambridge University Press. pp. 4–24.
- Sacks, David (2014). Encyclopedia of the Ancient Greek World. Infobase Publishing.
- Türker, Ayşe Çaylak (2014). "THE BYZANTINE CASTLE IN AKBAŞ ON THRACIAN CHERSONESSOS" (PDF). Turkish Studies. 9 (8): 1–11.
- von Bredow, Iris (2006). "Sestus". In Hubert Cancik; Helmuth Schneider; Christine F. Salazar; Manfred Landfester; Francis G. Gentry (eds.). Brill's New Pauly. Brill.
- Walbank, F. W. (2013). Philip V of Macedon. Cambridge University Press.
- Whitby, Michael (1985). "The Long Walls of Constantinople". Byzantion. 55 (2). Peeters Publishers: 560–583.
