= Alopeconnesus =

Ancient city and Aeolian colony

Coordinates: 40°18′50″N 26°14′58″E

Alopeconnesus or Alopekonnesos (Ancient Greek: Ἀλωπεκόννησος, "fox island") was an ancient Greek city located on the western coast of ancient Thrace, located in the region of the Thracian Chersonesus. It was an Aeolian colony, and was believed to have derived its name from the fact that the settlers were directed by an oracle to establish the colony, where they should first meet a fox with its cub. In the time of the Macedonian ascendancy, it was allied with, and under the protection of Athens. Coinage of Alopeconnesus has survived.

It was a member of the Delian League.

The Platonic philosopher, Menaechmus (Ancient Greek: Μάναιχμος) was from Alopeconnesus or Prokonnesos.

Its site has been located on Anafarta Liman.

== See also ==
- Greek colonies in Thrace
