= Antiochis (tribe) =

Ancient Athenian phyle (tribe)

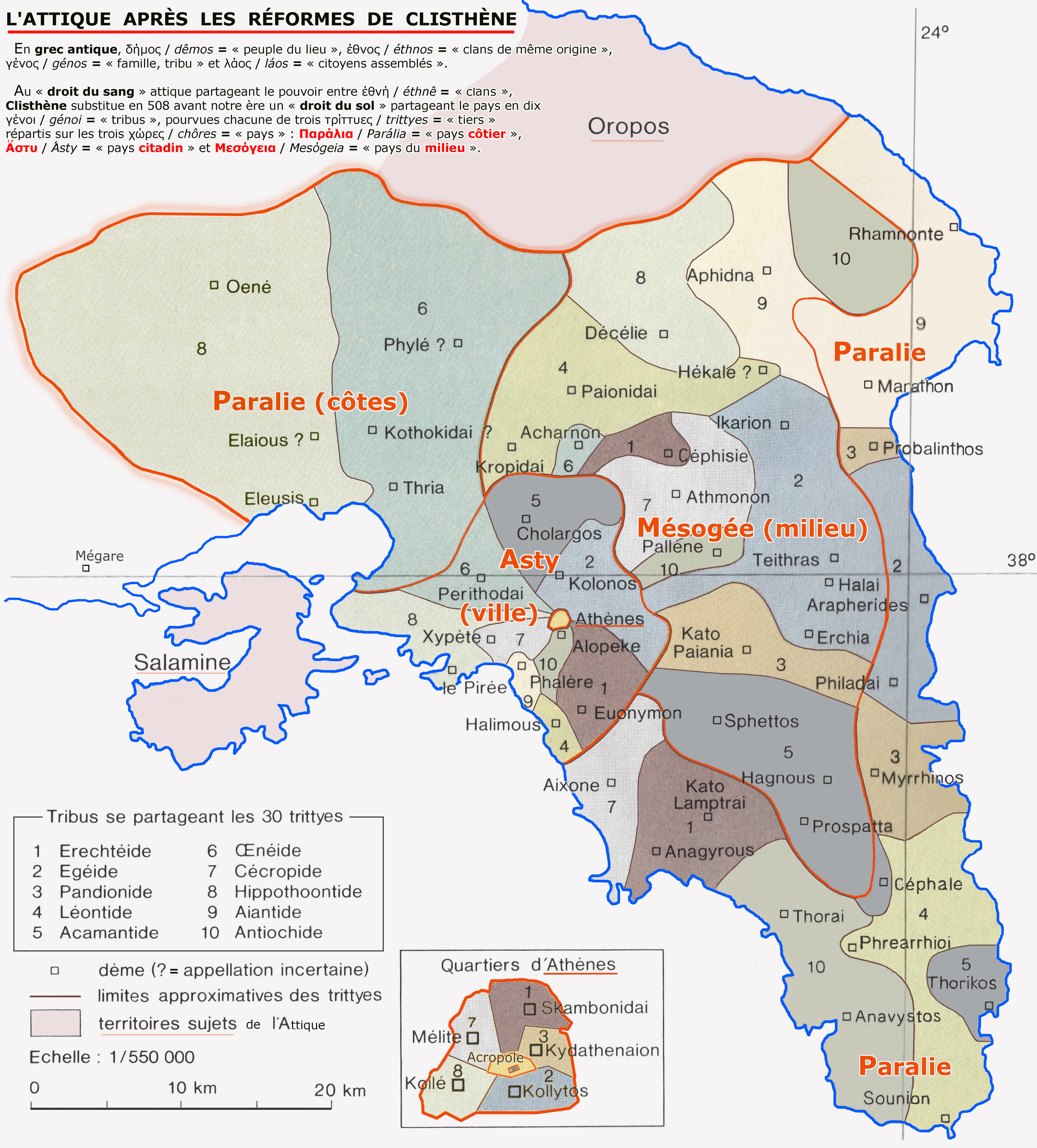
Map of ancient Attica. Demes belonging to the phyle of Antiochis are numbered "10."

Antiochis (Ancient Greek: Ἀντιοχίς) was one of the ten tribes (phylai) into which the Ancient Athenians were divided.

== Location and history ==
Is named after Antiochus, son of Heracles and Meda (daughter of Phylas, king of Ephyra).

Antiochis comprised 13 demes: Aigilia, Alopeke, Amphitrope, Anaphlystos, Atene, Besa, Eitea, Eroiadai, Kolonai, Krioa, Pallene, Semachidai, and Thorai.

Phalerum was a harbour belonging to the tribe. From this harbour the voyages of Theseus and Menestheus were said to have begun, for Crete and Troy respectively.

Socrates belonged to this tribe. The tribe was in possession of the prytany in the Council, at the time of the events concerning the ten generals active for Athens' navy in the battle of Arginusae.

Aristides was in command of this tribe's contingent during the Battle of Marathon.
