= Erechtheis =

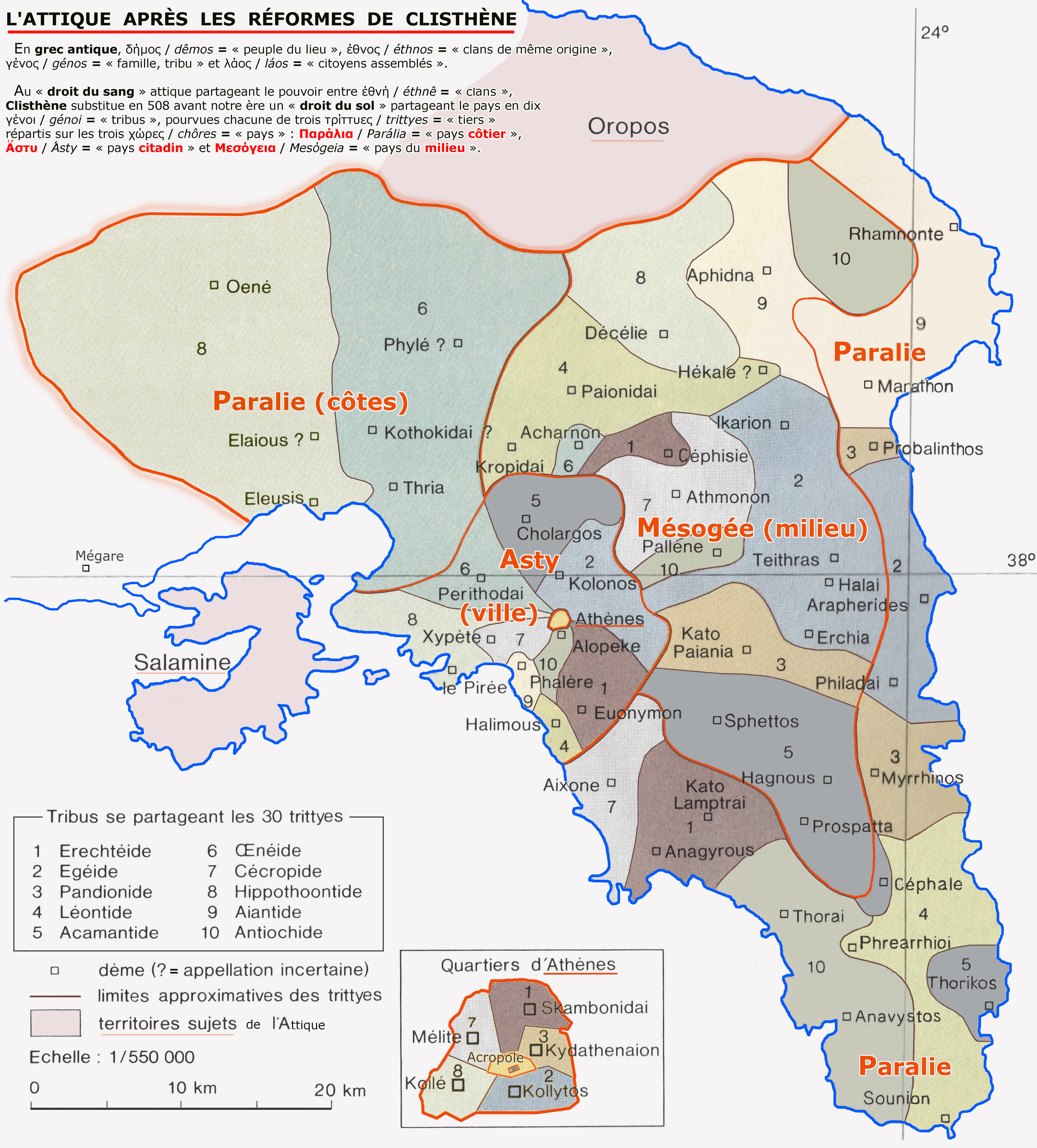
Map of ancient Attica. Trittyes belonging to the phyle of Erechtheis are numbered "1" and shaded brown.

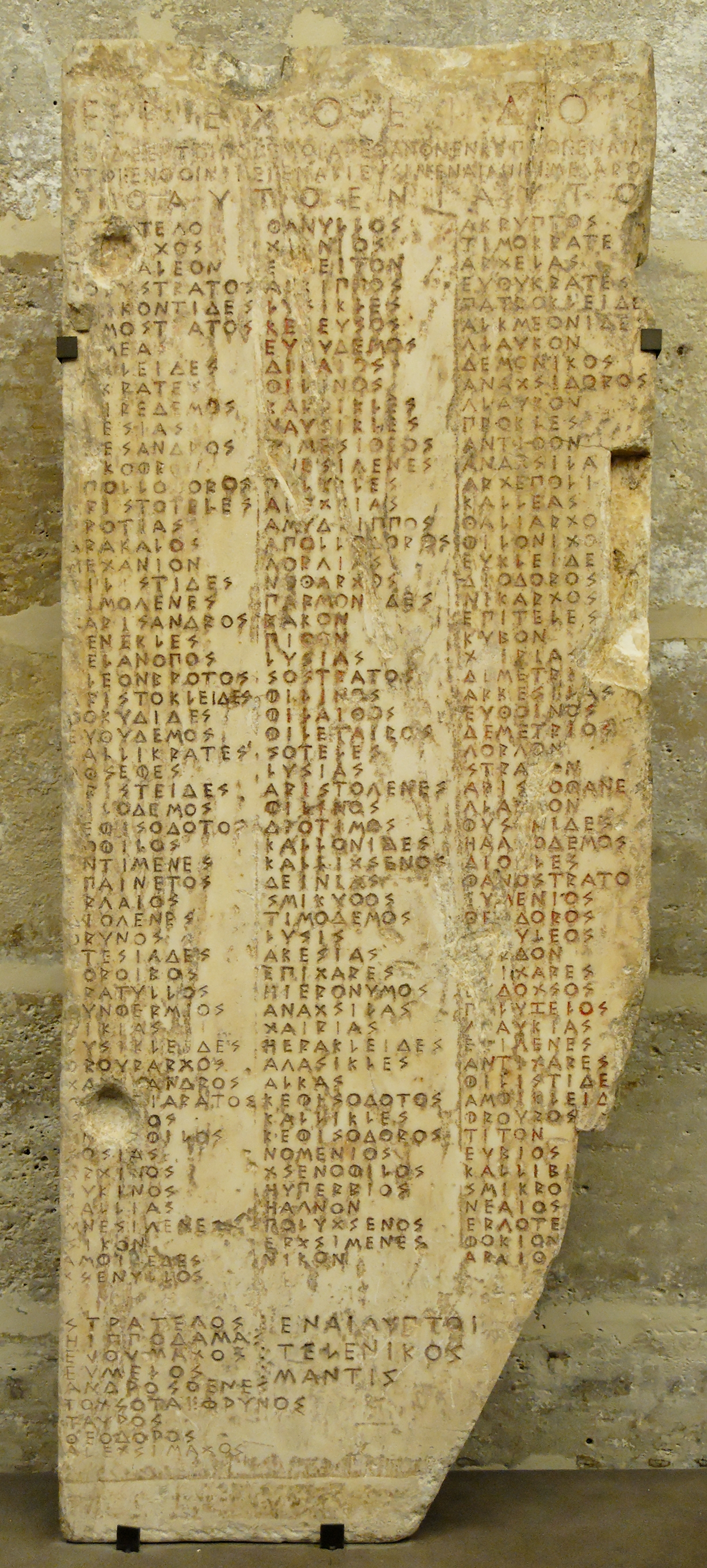
War memorial for men of the Erechtheis, 460–459 BC. The inscription reads: “Of the Erechteid Tribe, died at war in Cyprus, in Phoenicia, at Halieis, at Egina, at Megara, the same year.’ Follows a list of 170 dead, among whom are two strategoi and a soothsayer.

Erechtheis (Ancient Greek: Ἐρεχθηΐς) was a phyle (tribe) of ancient Athens with fourteen demes, named for the legendary king Erechtheus.

The phyle was created in the reforms of Kleisthenes. Although there is little specific reference to the tribe, an inscription dated to either 460 or 459BC in the form of a casualty list allows a little access. Two generals are listed for the single year on which the text insists, Ph[ryni]chos is followed in the list by Hippodamas, possibly indicating that he succeeded the former in the summer due to the death of Ph[ryni]chos. Alternatively they were elected together which was not uncommon later. The presence of a seer on the list is surprising, as their role of accompanying the army to interpret omens through the analysis of the entrails of sacrificed animals does not seem particularly dangerous.

That there is no other tribe mentioned on the inscription is unusual as most casualty lists arrange the dead according to tribe on a single stele or group of joined stelai. This stele, however, appears by the smoothness of the un-inscribed faces of the stone to have been solitary. Despite the use of personal names on the list, the repetitions means that the absence of patronymics prevent the identification of the individual and family referred to in each case. This deprivation of social status could be an example of democratic intentions, but it also does something to lessen the personal impact of the list, perhaps through an attempt to prevent social discord which would have resulted from the realisation of the impact on individual families and communities.

If the inscription had been divided into the fourteen demes, the exact effect of the losses on individual villages would have been much clearer. Despite the removal of the obvious social status of family associations, names themselves can be used to infer certain things. Greek naming patterns mean that frequently repeated names could indicate family links, and although more social study of Greek names is needed to understand this fully, it is likely that certain names could imply wealth or foreign connections. Examples of this are the names Arcesilas in line 154 of the casualty list, a name common in Sparta at the time, but only later in Athens; and Sicon in line 59 which mainly appear on pots, suggesting a more humble background.

== Demoi ==
=== Agryle ===
Agryle (Ancient Greek: Ἀγρυλή, Ἀραυλή, or Ἀγροιλή) was the name of two demoi: Lower Agryle (Agryle Hypenerthen) and Upper Agryle (Agryle Kathyperthen). They lay immediately south of the stadium in the city of Athens. The site is located southwest of modern Ardettos. It is probable that the district of Agrae located south of the Ilisos river, belonged to one of these demoi.

=== Anagyrous ===
See Anagyrous.

=== Euonymon ===
See Euonymon.

=== Kedoi ===
Cedi or Kedoi (Ancient Greek: Κηδοί) sent two delegates to the Boule. Its site is tentatively located near modern Ilioupoli.

=== Kephissia ===
See Kephisia.

=== Lamptrai ===
Lamptrai (Ancient Greek: Λαμπτραὶ), or Lamptra (Λάμπτρα, in inscriptions; Λάμπρα, in writers), was the name of two demoi: Lamptrai Kathyperthen (Ancient Greek: Λαμπτραὶ καθύπερθεν) or Upper Lamptai and Lamptrai Paraloi (Ancient Greek: Λαμπτραὶ παράλιαι) or Lower Lamtrai, also called Coastal or Maritime Lamptrai. These places were between Anagyrus, Thorae, and Aegilia. The site of Upper Lamptrai was near modern Lambrika, while the site of Lower Lamptrai was near modern Kitsi. At Lamptra the grave of Cranaus was shown.

=== Pambotadae ===
Pambotadae or Pambotadai (Ancient Greek: Παμβωτάδαι) was originally of the phyle of Erechtheis, but after 127/8 AD of the phyle of Hadrianis, sending one delegate every two years to the Athenian Boule, with Sybridae sending its delegate in lieu of Pambotadae in intervening years until 307/6 BC, after which Pambotadae sent a delegate each year, and after 224/3 BC, two delegates each year. Its site is unlocated.

=== Pergase ===
Pergase was the name of two demoi: Upper Pergase or Pergase Kathyperthen (Ancient Greek: Περγασή καθύπερθεν) and Lower Pergase or Pergase Hypenerthen (Ancient Greek: Περγασή ὑπένερθεν). Its site is located near modern Chelidonou.

=== Phegus ===
Phegus or Phegous (Ancient Greek: Φηγοῦς) sent one delegate to the Athenian Boule. Its site is unlocated.

=== Sybridae ===
Sybridae or Sybridai (Ancient Greek: Συβρίδαι) sent one delegate every two years, to the Athenian Boule, with Pambotadae sending its delegate in lieu of Sybridae in intervening years. Its site is unlocated, although Pliny the Elder mentions a river Siberus. The sculptor Cephisodotus the Elder was a member of this deme.

=== Themakos ===
Themacus or Themakos (Ancient Greek: Θημακός) was originally of the phyle of Erechtheis but after 224/223 BCE, the phyle of Ptolemais, sending one delegate to the Athenian Boule. Its site is unlocated.

== Tribal affiliates ==
Critias is thought, hypothetically, to have belonged to this phyle.

== See also ==
- Erechtheion
