= Kekropis =

Ancient Athenian phyle (tribe)

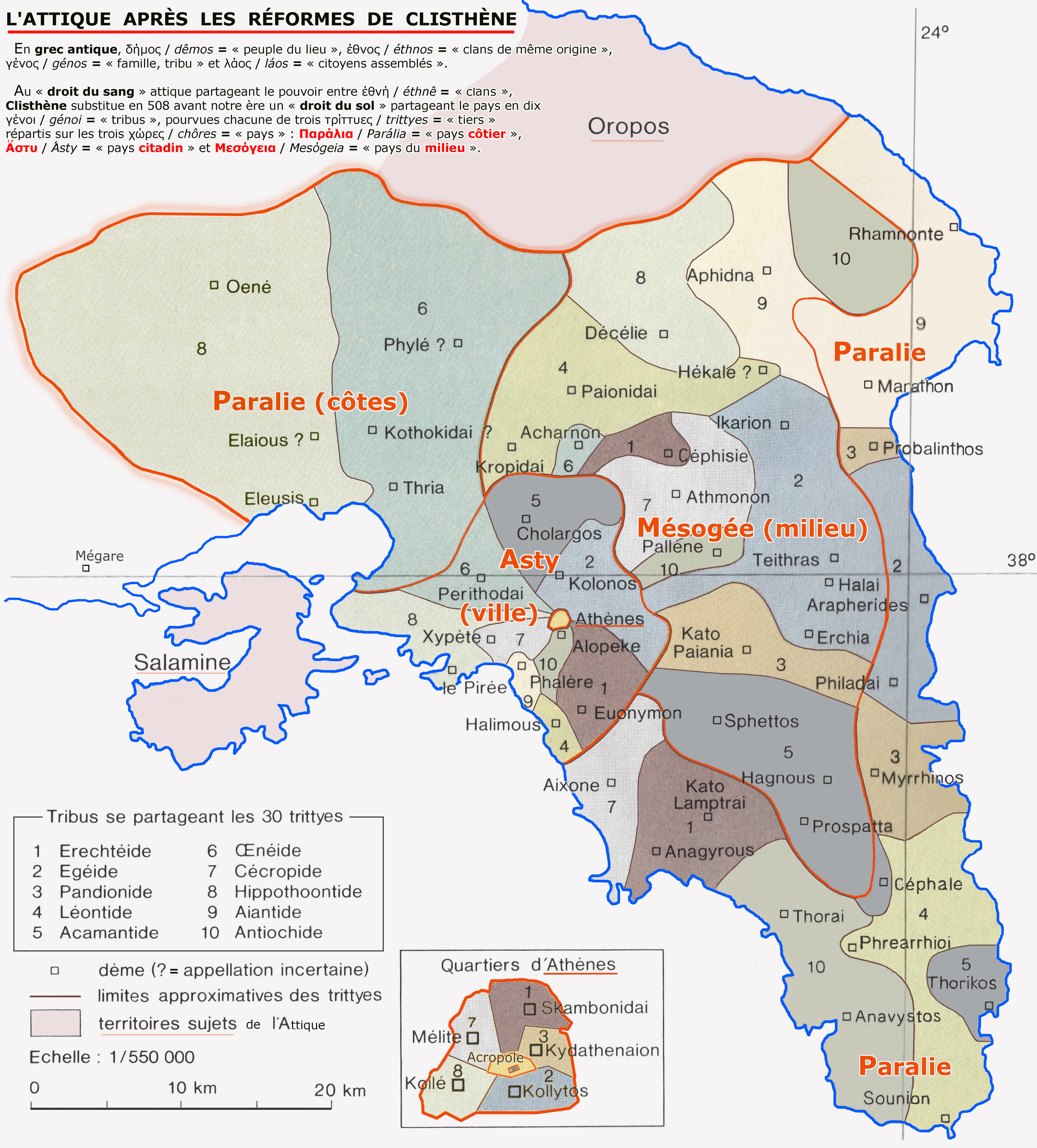
Map of ancient Attica. Trittyes belonging to the phyle of Kekropis are numbered "7" and shaded pale grey.

Kekropis (Greek: Κεκροπίς) was one of the phylai (tribes) of classical Athens, created during the reforms of Cleisthenes. It was named after the legendary hero Kekrops. Its demes were Aixone, Halai Aixonides, Daidalidai, Epieikidai, Melite, Xypete, Pithos, Sypalettos, Trinemeia and Phlya.
