= Potamus =

Potamus is an anglicization of the Ancient Greek potamos (ποταμός) meaning river or stream; it appears in the name Mesopotamia ("between the rivers").

Potamus may also refer to:

- the title character of The Peter Potamus Show, an animated television series

Potamos may refer to:

- Potamos (Corfu), a Greek town on the island of Corfu
- the most populated village on the Ionian island of Kythira
- a small village on the South Aegean island of Therasia
- an archeological site near Akrotiri, on the Greek island of Santorini
- a character in the Wedding Peach franchise

Potamus may refer to:

- Potamus (Attica), demoi of ancient Attica, Greece
- Potamus Deiradiotes, a deme of ancient Attica, Greece
- Potamus Hypenerthen, a deme of ancient Attica, Greece
- Potamus Kathyperthen, a deme of ancient Attica, Greece
