= Pandionis =

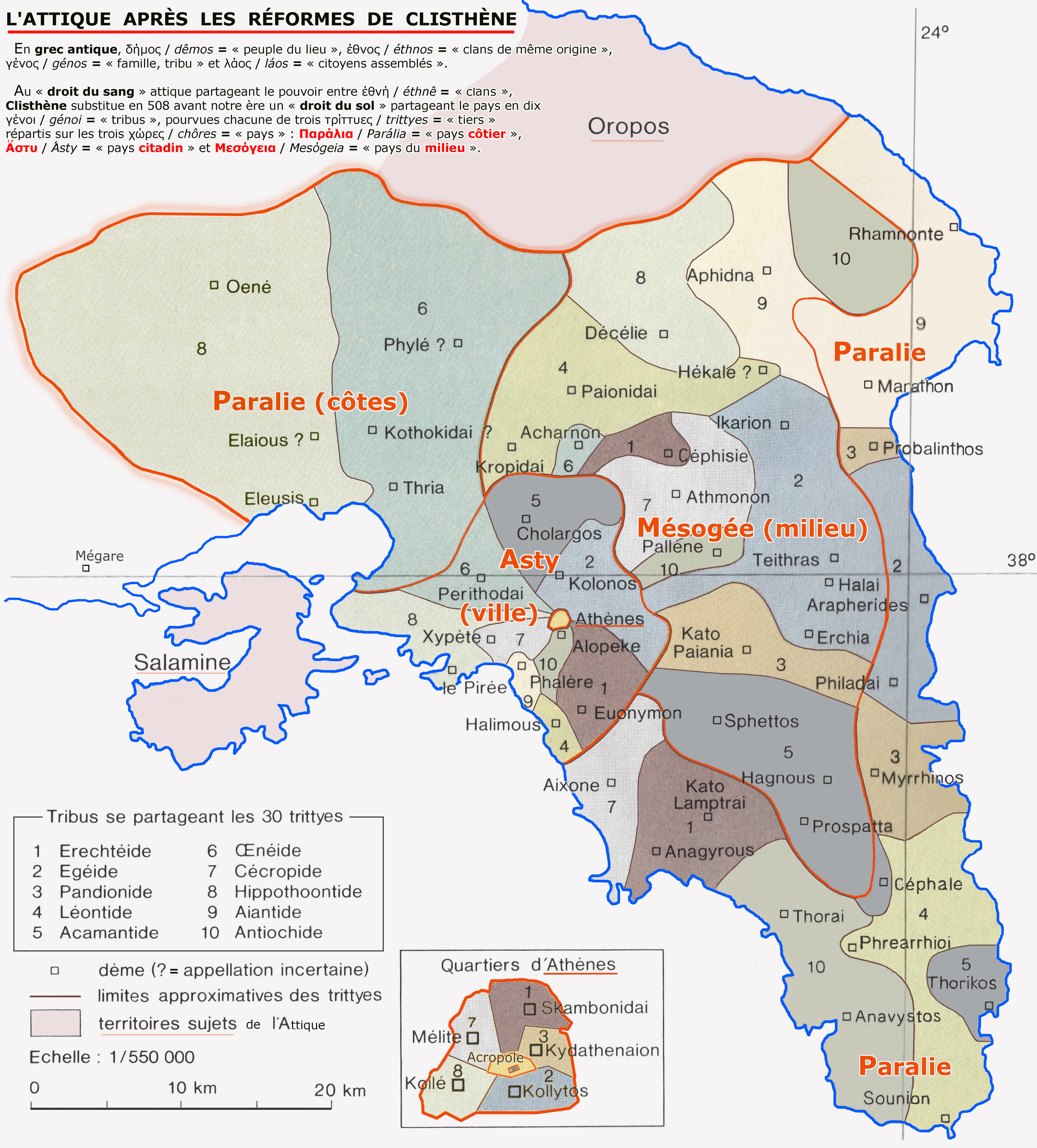
Map of ancient Attica. Trittyes belonging to the phyle of Pandionis are numbered "3" and shaded gold.

Pandionis (Ancient Greek: Πανδιονίς) was an ancient phyle (tribe or clan) of Attica. It was one of the original ten tribes in which Athenian citizens were divided after the late 6th century BC reforms of Cleisthenes. The citizens of Pandionis were known as Pandionidae (Ancient Greek: Πανδιονίδαι). At the time of its creation, Pandionis was composed of eleven demes, although the number of demes changed in the following centuries. The tribe was named after the eponymous hero Pandion, usually thought to have been either Pandion I or Pandion II, two of the legendary Kings of Athens.

== Demes ==
The names of the demes of Pandionis were Angele, Konthyle, Kydathenaion, Kytheros, Myrrhinous, Oa, Lower Paiania, Upper Paiania, Prasiai, Probalinthos, Steiria. The two sections of Paiania, typically counted among the demes of Pandionis, are recorded separately on at least four of the eight prytany and bouleutic catalogues of that period. Three additional demes that never appear in a list of councillors, i.e. Graes, Phegaia, and Kaletea, have also been attributed to Pandionis. After the creation of the Macedonian phylai in late 4th century BC, three of the demes (Kydathenaion, Kytheros, Upper Paiania) were given to the tribe of Antigonis, but later returned to Pandionis in 201-200 BC. At that time, Probalinthos was transferred to Attalis. In 220-219, the deme of Konthele was given to the new phyle of Ptolemais. The two phylai of Paiania became indistinguishable by the mid-2nd century BC, while the deme of Oa was later given to the new phyle of Hadrianis.

== See also ==
- Aigeis
- Leontis
- Aristophanes

== Sources ==
- Traill, John S. (1975). The Political Organization of Attica: A Study of the Demes, Trittyes, and Phylai, and Their Representation in the Athenian Council. ASCSA. ISBN 0876615140.
- McLean, Bradley H. (2002). An Introduction to Greek Epigraphy of the Hellenistic and Roman Periods from Alexander the Great Down to the Reign of Constantine (323 B.C.-A.D. 337). University of Michigan Press. ISBN 0472112384.
- Loraux, Nicole (2021). The Children of Athena; Athenian Ideas about Citizenship and the Division Between the Sexes. Princeton University Press. ISBN 9780691236834.
