= Pergase =

Two suburbs of ancient Attica in Greece

Pergase (Ancient Greek: Περγασή) was a name of two demoi in ancient Attica of the phyle of Erechtheis: Upper Pergase and Lower Pergase. Aristophanes places these demoi on the road between Athens and Aphidna.
