= Tyrmeidae =

Ancient Athenian deme

Tyrmeidae or Tyrmeidai (Ancient Greek: Τυρμεῖδαι) was a deme of ancient Attica of the phyle Oineis, sending one or two delegates to the Boule. It did not send representatives to the Boule in 360/359 BCE and in 335/334 BCE; it may have had a common representative with Epicephisia or Hippotomadae.

Its site is unlocated.
