= Butadae =

Coordinates: 37°59′15″N 23°42′37″E

Butadae or Boutadai (Ancient Greek: Βουτάδαι) was a deme of ancient Attica.

== History ==
The deme takes its name from the hero Butes, one of the legendary Argonauts, and a priest. The important family of Eteobutadae, who possessed some hereditary priestly positions, claimed the lineage of this hero and were originally called Butadae; after Cleisthenes created the deme with the same name, the priests changed their names to Eteobutadi or "real Butadae".

Probably Cleisthenes gave the deme the same name as the family of priests to reduce their power: in fact, the family held two of the most important religious offices, that of priestess of Athena and that of priest of Poseidon, who were revered on the Acropolis of Athens together with Butes. They also supported the inhabitants of the plain, who fought against the Alcmaeonidae for the control of Attica. Cleisthenes also weakened the family by placing the deme in the Oeneïs tribe rather than in Erechtheis, since they also possessed the cult of Erechtheum. The family saw this as an affront and changed its name from Butadae to Eteobutadae (i.e. "true descendants of Butes").

The site of Butadae is located northwest of Kerameis.
