= Auridae =

Auridae or Auridai (Ancient Greek: Αὐρίδαι) was a deme of ancient Attica, originally of the phyle of Hippothontis, but later of the phyle of Antigonis, sending one delegate to the Boule.

Its site is unlocated, but probably in the Thriasian Plain.
