= Chastieis =

Deme of ancient Attica

Chastieis (Ancient Greek: Χαστιεῖς), also known as Chastia, was a deme of ancient Attica, mentioned only by Hesychius; but in consequence of the similarity of name, it is supposed to have occupied the site of Chasia, a village in Attica, which is the first place met with on descending the pass of Phyle towards Athens. The editors of the Barrington Atlas of the Greek and Roman World point to that possibility, but leave the matter open.
