= Phegaea =

Phegaea or Phegaia (Ancient Greek: Φηγαία) may refer to either of two demoi of ancient Attica:

- Phegaea (Aigeis), a deme of the Aigeis phyle
- Phegaea (Pandionis), a deme of the Pandionis phyle
