= Hagnus (Attica) =

Coordinates: 37°52′42″N 23°56′16″E

Hagnus (Ancient Greek: Ἁγνοῦς, romanized: Hagnous) was a deme of ancient Attica. From the mythical story of the war of the Pallantidae against Theseus, we learn that the demoi of Pallene, Gargettus, and Agnus were adjacent. When Pallas was marching from Sphettus in the Mesogaea against Athens, he placed a body of his troops in ambush at Gargettus, under the command of his two sons, who were ordered, as soon as he was engaged with the army of Theseus, to march rapidly upon Athens and take the city by surprise, But the stratagem was revealed to Theseus by Leos of Agnus, the herald of Pallas; whereupon Theseus cut to pieces the troops at Gargettus. In consequence of this a lasting enmity followed between the inhabitants of Pallene and Agnus.

The road from Sphettus to Athens passed through the opening between Mount Pentelicus and Mount Hymettus. A monastery there by the name of Ieraka (or Hieraka) is the site of Gargettus. The proximity of Pallene and Gargettus is indicated by another legend. Pallene was celebrated for its temple of Athena; and we are told that Eurystheus was buried at Gargettus in front of the temple of Athena Pallenis. We know further that Pallene lay on one of the roads from the city to Marathon.

Between the monastery of Ieraka and the small village of Charvati, a celebrated inscription respecting money due to temples was discovered, and which was probably placed in the temple of Athena Pallenis. In Ieraka there was also found the boustrophedon inscription of Aristocles, which probably also came from the same temple. In one of the churches nearby, George Finlay found the following inscription fragment: ΞΕΟΦΑΝΗΣ ΠΑΛΛΗΝΕΥΣ - XEOPHANES PALLENEUS. This situation, where the roads of the Mesogaea necessarily unite in approaching Athens, is such a point as would be important, and often occupied in military operations; and accordingly, we find that on three occasions in the early history of Athens, Pallene was the scene of action; first, when Eurystheus fought against the Athenians and Heracleidae; again, when Theseus was opposed to the Pallantidae; and a third time when Peisistratus defeated the Alcmaeonidae. The inscription, however, in such a case, is not decisive evidence of location, as material may be moved (see spolia). Agnus is placed by Ludwig Ross in the hollow which lies between the extreme northern point of Hymettus and Ieraka. William Martin Leake, on the other hand, fixes it at Markópulo, in the southern part of the Mesogaea, because Finlay found at this place an inscription, .... υλίδης Ἀγνούσιος - ... ylides Agnousious. Modern scholars favor the Markopulo location, and fix the site as southwest of Markopoulo Dardiste.

Notable among the ancient articles related to Agnus is the Fragment from the tomb of Nikarete; Nikarete was a daughter of Ktesikles of Agnus.
