= Corydallus =

Ancient deme in Attica, Greece

Coordinates: 37°59′08″N 23°38′31″E

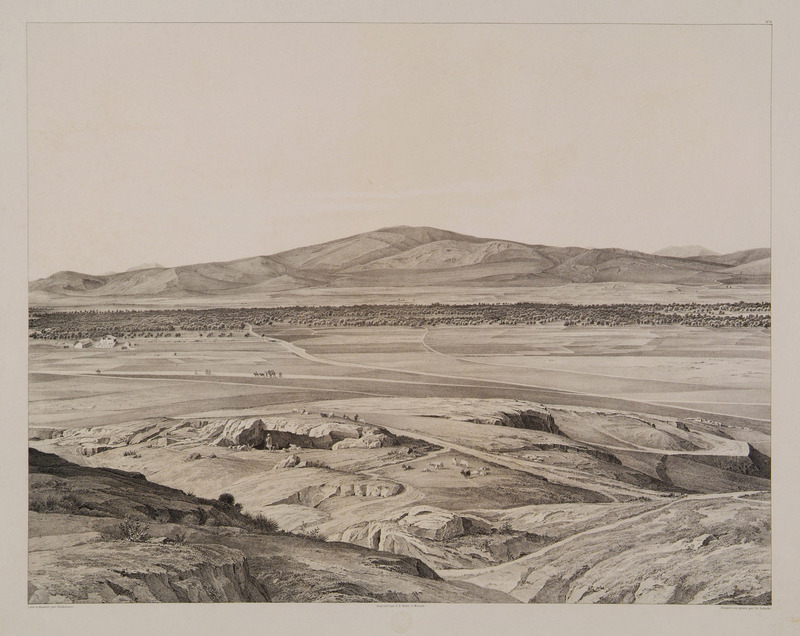
Panorama of Corydallus in 1841.

Corydallus or Korydallos (Ancient Greek: Κορυδαλλός) was a deme of ancient Attica, at the foot of the mountain of the same name, and is placed by Strabo between Thria and Peiraeeus, near the straits of Salamis, opposite the islands of Pharmacussae. This position is in accordance with the account of Diodorus, who, after relating the contest of Theseus with Cercyon, which, according to Pausanias, took place to the west of Eleusis, says that Theseus next killed Procrustes, whose abode was in Corydallus. Pliny the Elder mistakenly says that Corydallus is a mountain on the frontiers of Boeotia and Attica.

The site of Corydallus is near the modern Korydallos.
