= Eitea (Acamantis) =

Eitea (Ancient Greek: Εἰτέα) was a deme of ancient Attica, originally of the phyle of Acamantis, between 307/6 BCE and 201/0 BCE of Antigonis, and after 126/7 CE of Hadrianis, sending two delegates to the Athenian Boule.

Its site is unlocated.
