= Pithus =

Pithus or Pithos (Ancient Greek: Πίθος) was a deme in ancient Attica of the phyle of Cecropis, sending three, four, or five delegates to the Athenian Boule.

The name of the deme comes from Pittheus, the maternal grandfather of Theseus; so Theseus was originally a local hero. Pithus was head of Athena Pallene's league, along with Gargettus, Pallene, both neighboring Pithus, and Acharnae. The deme also celebrated its thesmophoria, led by two local women.

Its site was unlocated.
