= Deme =

Administrative unit in ancient Athens

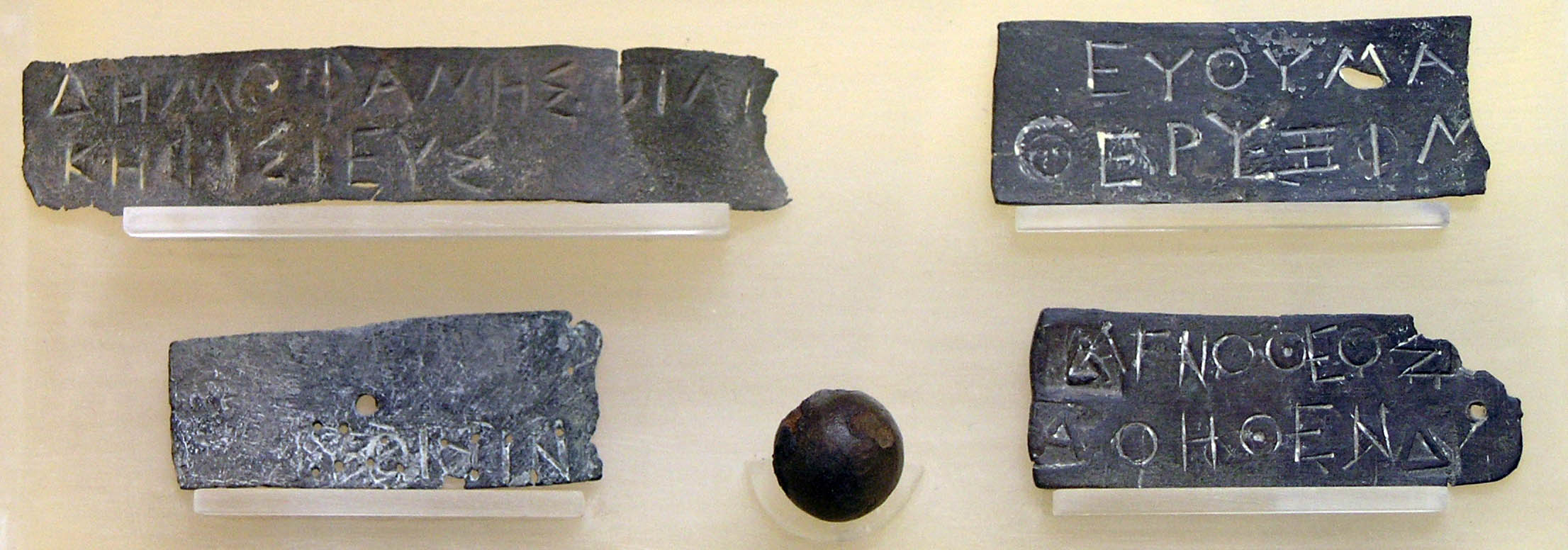
Pinakia, identification tablets (name, father's name, deme) used for tasks like jury selection, Museum at the Ancient Agora of Athens

In Ancient Greece, a deme or demos (Ancient Greek: δῆμος, plural: demoi, δῆμοι) was a suburb or a subdivision of Athens and other city-states. Demes as simple subdivisions of land in the countryside existed in the 6th century BC and earlier, but did not acquire particular significance until the reforms of Cleisthenes in 508 BC. In those reforms, enrollment in the citizen-lists of a deme became the requirement for citizenship; prior to that time, citizenship had been based on membership in a phratry, or family group. At this same time, demes were established in the main city of Athens itself, where they had not previously existed; in all, at the end of Cleisthenes' reforms, Athens was divided into 139 demes. Three other demes were created subsequently: Berenikidai (224/223 BC), Apollonieis (201/200 BC), and Antinoeis (AD 126/127). The establishment of demes as the fundamental units of the state weakened the gene, or aristocratic family groups, that had dominated the phratries.

A deme functioned to some degree as a polis in miniature, and indeed some demes, such as Eleusis and Acharnae, were in fact significant towns. Each deme had a demarchos who supervised its affairs; various other civil, religious, and military functionaries existed in various demes. Demes held their own religious festivals and collected and spent revenue.

Demes were combined within the same area to make trittyes, larger population groups, which in turn were combined to form the ten tribes, or phylai, of Athens. Each tribe contained one trittys from each of three regions: the city, the coast, and the inland area.

== Late Bronze Age ==
At Pylos, Linear B tablets refer to the damos as in the legal dispute of Eritha.

== Cleisthenes' reforms and modifications ==
=== First period: 508 – 307/306 BC ===
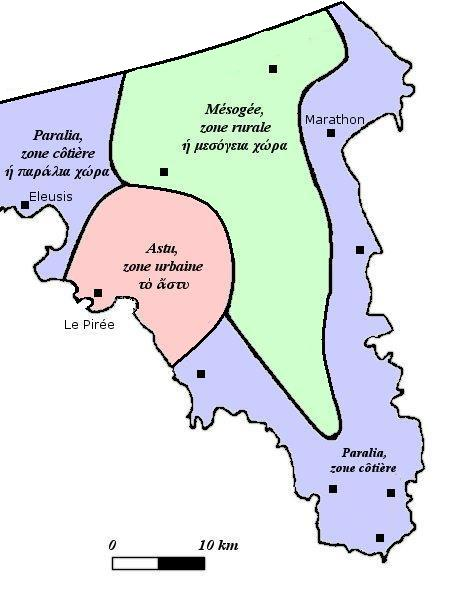
The division of the Athenian city-state (polis) into urban (pink), inland (green), and coastal (blue) zones by Cleisthenes

Cleisthenes divided the landscape in three zones—urban (asty), coastal (paralia) and inland (mesogeia)—and the 139 demes were organized into 30 groups called trittyes ("thirds"), ten for each of the zones and into ten tribes, or phylai, each composed of three trittyes, one from the coast, one from the city, and one from the inland area.

Cleisthenes also reorganized the Boule, created with 400 members under Solon, so that it had 500 members, 50 from each tribe, each deme having a fixed quota.

The ten tribes were named after legendary heroes and came to have an official order:

1. Erechtheis (Ἐρεχθηΐς) named after Erechtheus
2. Aigeis (Αἰγηΐς) named after Aegeus
3. Pandionis (Πανδιονίς) named after Pandion
4. Leontis (Λεοντίς) named after Leos, son of Orpheus
5. Acamantis (Ἀκαμαντίς) named after Acamas
6. Oineis (Οἰνηΐς) named after Oeneus
7. Kekropis (Κεκροπίς) named after Cécrops
8. Hippothontis (or Hippothoontis) (Ἱπποθοντίς) named after Hippothoon
9. Aiantis (Αἰαντίς) named after Ajax
10. Antiochis (Ἀντιοχίς) named after Antiochus, son of Heracles

=== Second period: 307/306 – 224/223 BC ===
In 307/306 – 224/223 BC the system was reorganized with the creation of two Macedonian Phylai (XI. Antigonis and XII. Demetrias), named after Demetrius I of Macedon and Antigonus I Monophthalmus, and an increase in the membership of the Boule to 600. Each of the ten tribes, except Aiantis, provided three demes (not necessarily one for trittyes); the missing contribution of Aiantis was covered by two demes of Leontis and one from Aigeis.

=== Third period: 224/223 – 201/200 BC ===
The Egyptian Phyle XIII. Ptolemais, named after Ptolemy III Euergetes was created in 224/223 BC and the Boule was again increased, this time to 650 members, the twelve tribes giving each a demos. A new village was created and named Berenikidai after Ptolemy's wife Berenice II of Egypt.

=== Fourth period: 201/200 BC – 126/127 AD ===
In 201/200 BC the Macedonian Phylae were dissolved and the villages (except the two given to Ptolemais) went back to their original tribes. In the spring of 200 BC Tribe XIV. Attalis, named after Attalus I, was created following the same scheme used for the creation of the Egyptian Phyle: each tribe contributed a deme and a new deme, Apollonieis, was created in honour of Apollonis, wife of Attalus I of Pergamum. As a consequence there were again 12 tribes and 600 members of the Boule. From this period onward, quotas were no longer assigned to the demes for the 50 Boule members from each tribe.

=== Fifth period: 126/127 – third century ===
The last modification was the creation in 126/127 of XV. Hadrianis, named after the Emperor Hadrian, following the same scheme: each tribe contributed a deme and a new deme, Antinoeis, was created in honour of Hadrian's favourite, Antinous. Each tribe contributed 40 members to the Boule.

== Representation in the Boule ==
In the first three periods there it a more detailed system of fixed quotas which essentially remained unchanged. There is no evidence for a single general reapportionment of quotas within each of the first three periods, while there are evident small quota-variations between the first and the second periods.

More precisely in:

307/306 BC, 24 demes increased of 1 bouleutes, 13 of 2, 5 or 3, 6 of 4 and 1 (Lower Paiania) of 11 and there is not a single example of a decreased quota.
224/223 BC 4 demes increased of 1 bouletes

As regards the last two periods, the material illustrates the complete collapse of the quota-system from 201/200 BC.

== Spurious and Late Roman demes ==
Some deme lists suggest extensions to the list of 139+3 Demes by adding 43 additional names, some of which have been considered by scholars as Attic demes. The criticism performed by John S. Traill shows that 24 are the result of error, ancient or modern, or of misinterpretation and 19 are well known chiefly from inscriptions of the second and third centuries AD, i.e. in the fifth period, and thus for political purposes they were originally dependent on legitimate Cleisthenic demes.

== Homonymous and divided demes ==
There were six pairs of homonymous demes:

- Halai Araphenides (VII.Kekropis) and Halai Aixonides (II.Aigeis)
- Oion Dekeleikon (VIII.Hippothontis; later XIII.Ptolemais, XIV.Attalis) and Oion Kerameikon (IV.Leontis; affiliated with XII.Demetrias in the Macedonian period)
- Eitea: there were two demes of that name, but no modifier is known. One is associated to V.Acamantis, later XI.Antigonis and XV.Hadrianis; the other is associated to X.Antiochis
- Oinoe and Oinoe: again no modifier is known; one deme was associated to VIII.Hippothontis, later XII.Demetrias and XIII.Ptolemais; the other was associated to IX.Aiantis, later XIV.Attalis and XV.Hadrianis.
- Kolonai: again no modifier is known; one deme was associated to IV.Leontis; the other to X.Antiochis, later XI.Antigonis and XIII.Ptolemais.
- Eroiadai: again no modifier is known for these two demes associated to VIII.Hippothontis and X.Antiochis.

There were six divided demes, one composed of three parts:

- Agryle, Upper Agryle and Lower Agryle (I.Erechtheis); one of them, but there is no prosopographical information for identifying which, was transferred to XI.Antigonis and went back at the end of the Macedonian period; later one of them (again it is uncertain which) was transferred to XIV.Attalis.
- Lamptrai, Upper Lamptrai and Coastal/Lower Lamptrai (I.Erechtheis); Upper Lamptrai was transferred to XI.Antigonis and went back at the end of the Macedonian period.
- Pergase, Upper and Lower (I.Erechtheis); one of them (no prosopographical information allows to decide which) was transferred to XI.Antigonis and went back at the end of the Macedonian period.
- Ankyle: no special designations of either section are preserved, although they are presumed to have the regular Upper and Lower forms. One section, perhaps Upper Ankale, was transferred to XI.Antigonis and went back at the end of the Macedonian period.
- Paiania, Upper Paiania and Lower Paiania (III.Pandionis); Upper Paiania, was transferred to XI.Antigonis and went back at the end of the Macedonian period.
- Potamos has three sections, Upper Potamos, Lower Potamos and Potamos Deiradiotes (IV.Leontes); during the Macedonian period, Potamos Deiradiotes belonged to XI.Antigonis and Lower Potamos to XII.Demetrias.

== List of Athenian demes according to tribes/phylai (φυλαί) ==
=== The ten Cleisthenic tribes ===
I. Erechtheïs (Ἐρεχθηΐς)
Deme	#	#	#	Notes
				city
Upper Agryle	2	3	3	One deme to XI.Antigonis in the second and third periods and to XIV.Attalis in the fourth period
Lower Agryle	2	3	3	One deme to XI.Antigonis in the second and third periods and to XIV.Attalis in the fourth period
Euonymon	10	12	12	
Themakos	1	1		to XIII.Ptolemais in the third period
				coast
Anagyrous	6	8	8	
Kedoi	2	2	2	
Upper Lamptrai	5			to XI.Antigonis in the second and third periods
Coastal Lamptrai	9	10	10	
Pambotadai	1(0)	1	2	to XV.Hadrianis in the fifth period
Kephisia (?)				inland
Kephisia	6	8	8	
Upper Pergase	2	3	3	One deme to XI.Antigonis in the second and third periods
Lower Pergase	2	3	3	One deme to XI.Antigonis in the second and third periods
Phegous	1	1	1	
Sybridai	0(1)	1	1	
Deme	#	#	#	Notes

II. Aigeis (Αἰγηΐς)
Deme	#	#	Notes
			city
Upper Ankyle	1		to XI.Antigonis in the second and third periods
Lower Ankyle	1	1	
Bate	1(2)	1	
Diomeia	1		to XII.Demetrias in the second and third periods
Erikeia	1	2	
Hestiaia	1	1	
Kollytos	3	4	
Kolonos	2	2	
			coast
Araphen	2	2	
Halai Araphenides	5	9	
Otryne	1	1	
Phegaia	3(4)	3(4)	to XV.Hadrianis in the fifth period
Philaidai	3	3	
Epakria			inland
Erchia	7(6)	11	
Gargettos	4		to XI.Antigonis in the second and third periods
Ikarion	5(4)		to XI.Antigonis in the second and third periods and to XIV.Attalis in the fourth period
Ionidai	2(1)	2	
Kydantidai	1(2)	1(2)	to XIII.Ptolemais in the third period
Myrrhinoutta	1	1	
Plotheia	1	2	
Teithras	4	4	
Deme	#	#	Notes

III. Pandionis (Πανδιονίς)
Deme	#	#	#	Notes
Kydathenaion				city
Kydathenaion	12(11)			to XI.Antigonis in the second and third periods
Myrrhinous				coast
Angele	2(3)	4	4	
Myrrhinous	6	8	8	
Prasiai	3	3	3	
Probalinthos	5	5	5	to XIV.Attalis in the fourth period
Steiria	3	3	4	
Paiania				inland
Konthyle	1	1		to XIII.Ptolemais in the third period
Kytheros	2(1)			to XI.Antigonis in the second and third periods
Oa	4	4	4	to XV.Hadrianis in the fifth period
Upper Paiania	1			to XI.Antigonis in the second and third periods
Lower Paiania	11	22	22	
Deme	#	#	#	Notes

IV. Leontis (Λεοντίς)
Deme	#	#	#	Notes
Skambonidai				city
Halimous	3	3	3	
Kettos	3	3(4)	3	
Leukonoion	3	5	5	
Oion Kerameikon	1			to XII.Demetrias in the second and third periods
Skambonidai	3	4	4	to XV.Hadrianis in the fifth period
Upper Potamos	2	2	2	
Lower Potamos	1			to XII.Demetrias in the second and third periods
Phrearrhioi				coast
Deiradiotai	2			to XI.Antigonis in the second and third periods
Potamioi Deiradiotai	2			to XI.Antigonis in the second and third periods
Phrearrhioi	9	9	10	
Sounion	4	6	6	to XIV.Attalis in the fourth period
Hekale (?)				inland
Aithalidai	2			to XI.Antigonis in the second and third periods
Cholleidai	2	5	5	
Eupyridai	2	2	2	
Hekale	1	1		to XIII.Ptolemais in the third period
Hybadai	2	2(1)	2	
Kolonai	2	2	2	
Kropidai	1	1	1	
Paionidai	3	3	3	
Pelekes	2	2	2	
Deme	#	#	#	Notes

V. Akamantis (Ἀκαμαντίς)
Deme	#	#	Notes
Cholargos			city
Cholargos	4	6	
Eiresidai	1	2	
Hermos	2	2	
Iphistiadae	1	1	
Kerameis	6	6	
Thorikos			coast
Kephale	9	12	
Poros	3		to XII.Demetrias in the second and third periods
Thorikos	5(6)	6	
Sphettos			inland
Eitea	2		to XI.Antigonis in the second and third periods and to XV.Hadrianis in the fifth period
Hagnous	5		to XII.Demetrias in the second and third periods and to XIV.Attalis in the fourth period
Kikynna	2	3	
Prospalta	5	5	to XIII.Ptolemais in the third period
Sphettos	5	7	
Deme	#	#	Notes

VI. Oeneïs (Οἰνηΐς)
Deme	#	#	Notes
Lakiadai			city
Boutadai	1	1	to XIII.Ptolemais in the third period
Epikephisia	1(2)	1	
Hippotomadai	1		to XII.Demetrias in the second and third periods
Lakiadai	2	3	
Lousia	1	1	
Perithoidai	3	3	
Ptelea	1	1	
Tyrmeidai	1(0)	1	to XIV.Attalis in the fourth period
Thria			coast
Kothokidai	2(1)		to XII.Demetrias in the second and third period
Oe	6(7)	6	
Phyle	2		to XII.Demetrias in the second and third period
Thria	7	8	to XV.Hadrianis in the fifth period
Pedion			inland
Acharnae	22	25	
Deme	#	#	Notes

VII. Kekropis (Κεκροπίς)
Deme	#	#	Notes
Melite (?)			city
Daidalidai	1		to XII.Demetrias in the second and third periods and to XV.Hadrianis in the fifth period
Melite	7		to XII.Demetrias in the second and third periods
Xypete	7		to XII.Demetrias in the second and third periods
Aixone(?)			coast
Aixone	8	12	
Halai Aixonides	6	10	
			inland
Athmonon	6	10	to XIV.Attalis in the fourth period
Epieikidai	1	1(0)	
Phlya	7	9	to XIII.Ptolemais in the third period
Pithos	2(3)	4	
Sypalettos	2	2	
Trinemeia	2	2	
Deme	#	#	Notes

VIII. Hippothontis (Ἱπποθοντίς)
Deme	#	#	Notes
Peiraieus			city
Hamaxanteia	2	2	
Keiriadai	2	2	
Koile	3		to XII.Demetrias in the second and third periods
Korydallos	1	1	to XIV.Attalis in the fourth period
Peiraieus	9	10	
Thymaitadai	2	2	
Eleusis			coast
Acherdous	1	1	
Auridai	1		to XI.Antigonis in the second and third periods
Azenia	2	2	
Elaious	1	1	to XV.Hadrianis in the fifth period
Eleusis	11	12	
Kopros	2	2	
Oinoe	2		to XII.Demetrias in the second and to XIII.Ptolemais in the third period
Dekeleia (?)			inland
Anakaia	3	3	
Eroiadai	1	2	
Dekeleia	4	6	
Oion Dekeleikon	3	3	to XIII.Ptolemais in the third period and to XIV.Attalis in the fourth period
Deme	#	#	Notes

IX. Aiantis (Αἰαντίς)
Deme	#	#	#	Notes
Phaleron (?)			city	
Phaleron	9	9	13	
Thorikos			coast	
Marathon	10	10	13	
Oinoe	4	4	6	to XIV.Attalis in the fourth period and to XV.Hadrianis in the fifth period
Rhamnous	8	8	12	
Trikorynthos	3	3	6	to XV.Hadrianis in the fifth period
Aphidna (?)			inland	
Aphidna	16	16		to XIII.Ptolemais in the third period and to XV.Hadrianis in the fifth period
Deme	#	#	#	Notes

X. Antiochis (Ἀντιοχίς)
Deme	#	#	Notes
Alopeke			city
Alopeke	10	12	
Anaphlistos			coast
Aigilia	6	7	to XIII.Ptolemais in the third period
Amphitrope	2	3	
Anaphlystos	10	11	
Atene	3		to XII.Demetrias in the second and third periods and to XIV.Attalis in the fourth period
Besa	2	2	to XV.Hadrianis in the fifth period
Thorai	4		to XII.Demetrias in the second and third periods
Pallene			inland
Eitea	2(1)	2	
Eroiadai	1	1	
Kolonai	2		to XI.Antigonis in the second period and to XIII.Ptolemais in the third period
Krioa	1	2	
Pallene	6(7)	9	
Semachidai	1	1	
Deme	#	#	Notes

=== The Macedonian tribes ===
XI. Antigonis
Deme	Former phyle	Trittys	#	#
Lower Agryle	Erachtheis	city	3	3
Upper Lamptrai	Erachtheis	coast	5	5
Lower Pergase	Erachtheis	inland	2	2
Upper Ankyle	Aigeis	city	1	1
Ikarion	Aigeis	inland	5	6
Kydathenaion	Pandionis	city	12	12
Kytheros	Pandionis	inland	2	2
Upper Paiania	Pandionis	inland	1	1
Aithalidai	Leontis	inland	2	2
Deiradiotai	Leontis	coast	2	2
Potamos Deiradiotes	Leontis	coast	2	2
Eitea	Akamantis	inland	2	2
Auridai	Hippothontis	coast	1	1
Kolonai	Antiochis	inland	2	2

XII. Demetrias
Deme	Former phyle	Trittys	#	#
Diomeia	Aigeis	city	1	1
Oion Kerameikon	Leontis	city	1	1
Lower Potamos	Leontis	coast	1	2
Hagnous	Akamantis	inland	5	5
Poros	Akamantis	coast	3	3
Hippotomadai	Oineis	city	1	1
Kothokidai	Oineis	coast	2	2
Phyle	Oineis	coast	2	6
Daidalidai	Kekropis	city	1	1
Melite	Kekropis	city	7	7
Xypete	Kekropis	city	7	7
Koile	Hippothontis	city	3	3
Oinoe	Hippothontis	coast	2	2
Atene	Antiochis	coast	3	4
Thorai	Antiochis	coast	4	5

=== The later tribes ===
XIII. Ptolemais
Deme	Former phyle	Trittys	#	#	#
Kolonai	Antigonis	inland	2	2	2
Oinoe	Demetrias	coast	2	2	2
Themakos	Erechteis	city	1	1	1
Kydantidai	Aigeis	inland	1 (2)	1 (2)	1
Konthyle	Pandionis	inland	1	1	1
Hekale	Leontis	inland	1	1	1
Prospalta	Akamantis	inland	5	5	5
Boutadai	Oineis	city	1	1	1
Phlya	Kekropis	inland	6	9	9
Oion Dekeleikon	Hippothontis	inland	3	3	3
Aphidna	Aiantis	inland	16	16	16
Aigilia	Antiochis	coast	6	7	7
Berenikidai		new			1

XIV. Attalis
Deme	Former phyle	Trittys	#	#	#
Lower Agrile	Erechteis	city	3	3	3
Ikarion	Aigeis	inland	5 (4)	6	6
Probalinthos	Pandionis	coast	5	5	5
Sounion	Leontis	coast	4	6	6
Oion Dekailekon	Ptolemais	inlamd	3	3	3
Hagnous	Akamantis	inland	5	5	5
Tyrmeidai	Oineis	city	1(0)	1	1
Athmonon	Kekropis	inland	6	10	10
Korydallos	Hippothontis	city	3	3	3
Oinoe	Aiantis	coast	4	4	6
Atene	Antiochis	coast	3	4	4
Apollonieis		new			

XV. Hadrianis
Deme	Former phyle	Trittys	#	#	#
Pambotadai	Erechteis	coast	1 (0)	1 (0)	2
Phegaia	Aigeis	coast	3 (4)	3 (4)	4
Oa	Pandionis	inland	4	4	4
Skambonidai	Leontis	city	3	4	4
Aphidna	Ptolemais	inlamd	16	16	16
Eitea	Akamantis	inland	2	2	2
Thria	Oineis	coast	7	8	8
Daidalidai	Kekropis	city	1	1	1
Elaious	Hippothontis	coast	1	1	1
Trikorynthos	Aiantis	coast	3	3	6
Besa	Antiochis	coast	2	2	2
Oinoe	Attalis	coast	4	4	6
Antinoeis		new			

== The ten tribes of Thurii ==
When the city was settled under the support of Pericles and the command of Lampon and Xenocritus the population was organized in ten tribes, following the Athenian organization: there were tribes for the population of 1. Arcadia, 2. Achaea, 3. Elis, 4. Boeotia, 5. Delphi, 6. Dorians, 7. Ionians, 8. population of Euboea, 9. the islands and 10. Athenians.

== Demos as personification ==
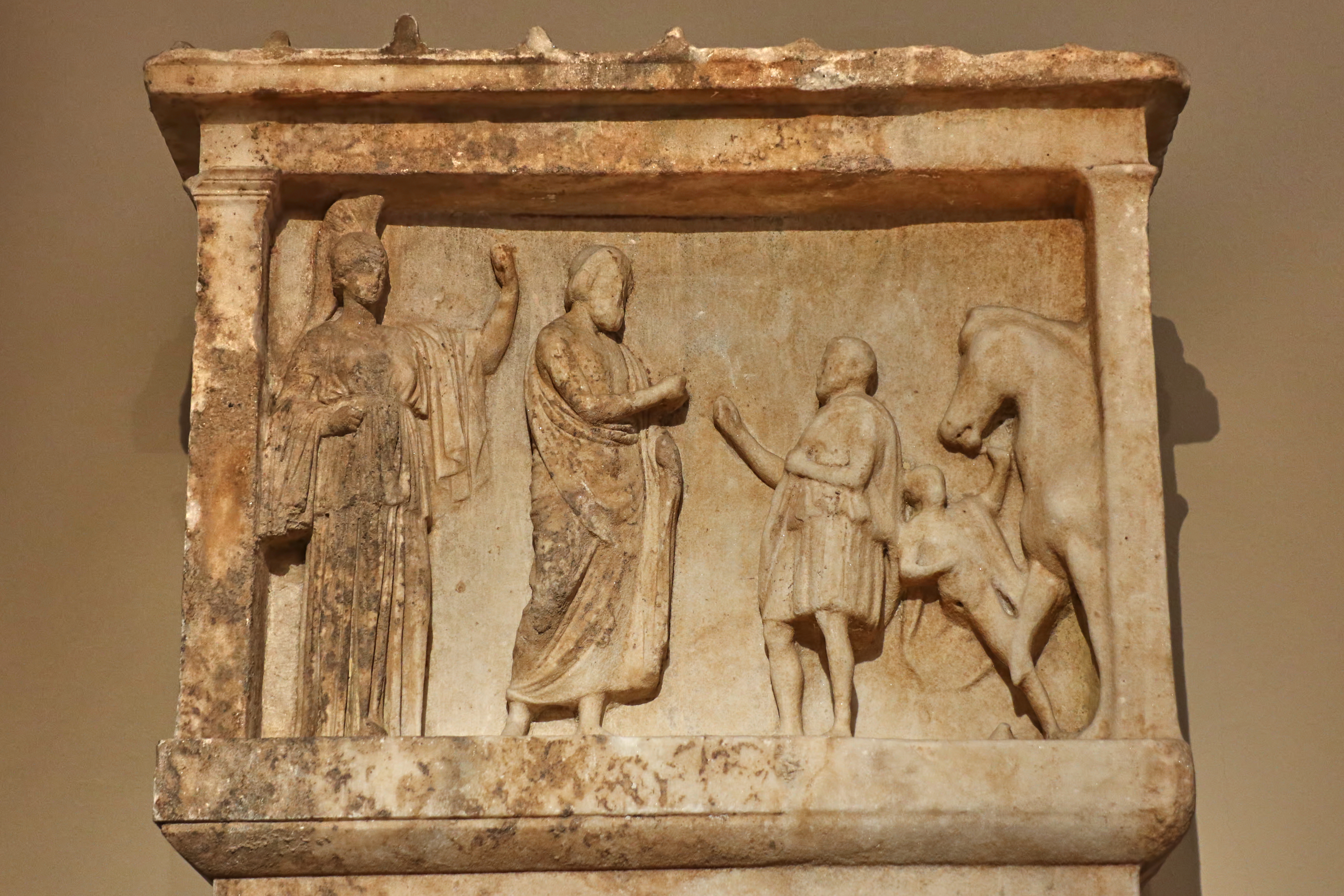
Stele from the agora of Athens: Athena backs up Demos as he presents a wreath to the man honored (latter 4th century BCE)

The deme as the "body politic" began to be personified, typically as a bearded older man, in Greek art and literature of the early to mid-4th century BCE. Demos wears the himation garment and often holds a staff. He is usually standing; when seated, the figure can be ambiguous as to whether it represents Zeus. In Athens, thirty-two depictions of Demos, some arguable, occur within reliefs on honorary steles set up by the ekklesia, the democratic assembly of citizens. As a quasi-deity, Demos is neither the polis itself, which tended to be a female personification, nor its tutelary deity, but seems rather to have represented the political process as such. At times he is depicted with Boule, the personification of the citizens' administrative council of a city (boule), who is not known to have been depicted other than in the company of Demos. In the Hellenistic period, depictions of Demoi become more youthful, tending toward a similarity to the Genius of the Roman People.

In the play known in English as The Knights, Aristophanes satirizes the Demos of Athens as the master to whom politicians are enslaved. The play is set in the house of Demos. The "love of country" extolled by politicians was mocked by Aristophanes as a literal sexual relationship, with Cleon as erastes of Demos, who is susceptible to flattery and seduction.

The personification of the demos thus visualized the power of the people as consolidated in an individual — an image that could be manipulated by demagogues. In the Roman era, the demos of a particular place embodied could be integrated into imperial cult, as with the Demos of Ephesos represented at the Temple of Hadrian.

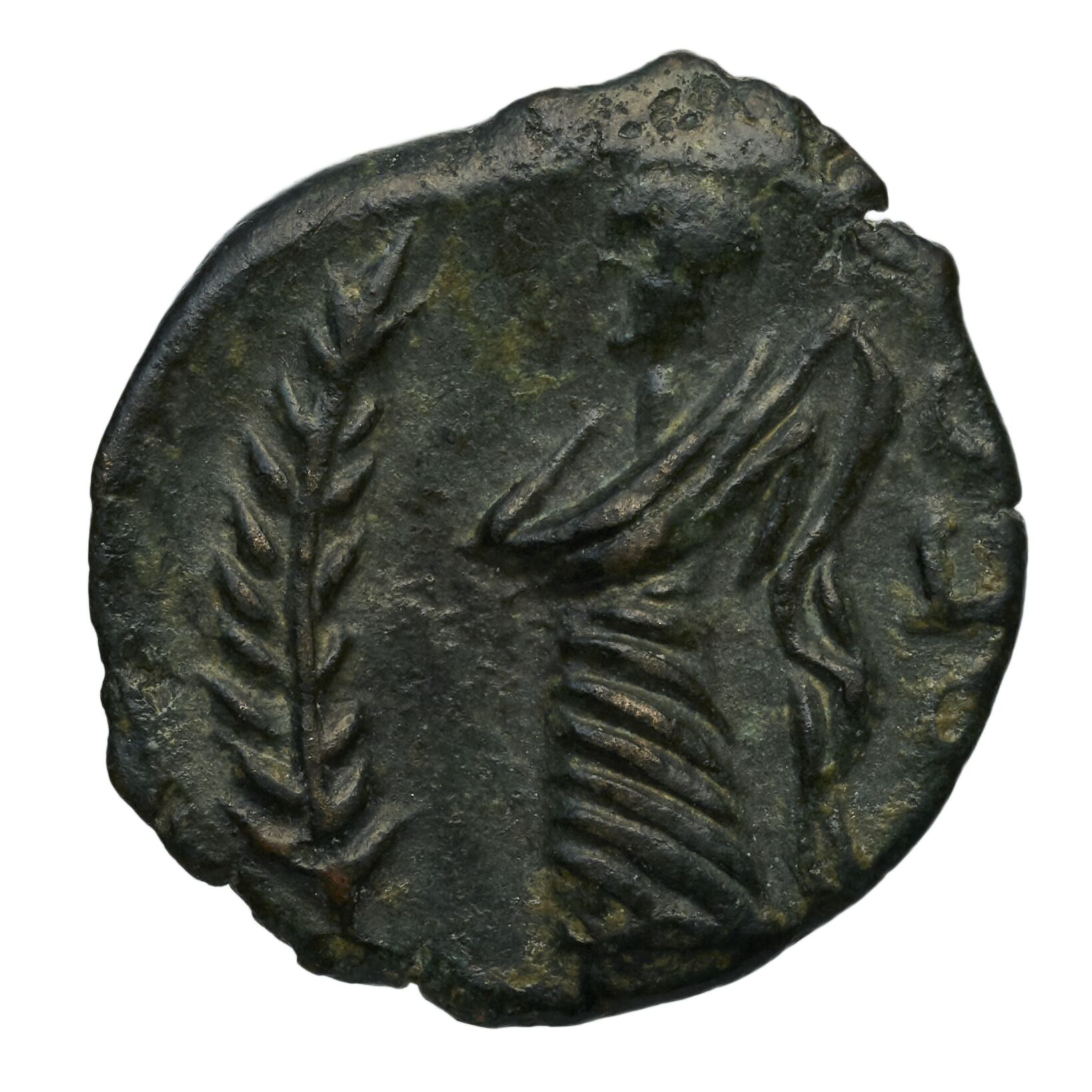
Bronze coin of the Volcae Arecomici of Gaul, interpreted as representing the Demos of Nemausus (Nîmes)

A bronze coin minted at Nîmes, France, has been interpreted traditionally as representing the "Demos" of Nemausus, the city's Latin name. On the reverse, a togate figure stands before a palm or evergreen branch, with an inscription AREC taken as an abbreviation for Arecomici. The head is not covered as would be expected for the depiction of libation or religious gesture, and no comparable coin is known. A head of the Diana type appears on the obverse with the inscription VOLCAE. The Volcae Arecomici were a Gallic people whose metropolis, in Strabo's terminology, was Nemausus. Although Nîmes had been integrated into the Roman province of Transalpine Gaul in the late 2nd century BC, during the time of Strabo (64/63 BC to AD 24) the Arecomici exercised authority over their twenty-four ethnically cohesive communities independent of direct Roman oversight. The "Demos" bronze unit is dated to 50–25 BC, just after the Gallic Wars, during which the Transalpine Gauls had maintained their Roman fealty despite provocations from the central Gauls. The coin may have been issued in 49 BC to mark Caesar's extension of Latin rights to the citizens of Nemausus, well before the town's formal refounding as a Roman colonia. The inscription asserts their localized identity, while the wearing of the toga represents their standing as a citizen body to participate in politics.

== Later usage ==
The term "deme" (dēmos) survived into the Hellenistic and Roman eras. By the time of the Byzantine Empire, the term was used to refer to one of the four chariot racing factions: the Reds, the Blues, the Greens and the Whites.

In modern Greece, the term dēmos is used to denote one of the municipalities.
