= Conthyle =

Deme of ancient Attica

Coordinates: 37°57′32″N 23°55′46″E

Conthyle or Konthyle (Ancient Greek: Κονθύλη) was a deme of ancient Attica, originally of the phyle of Pandionis, but after 224/3 BCE of the phyle of Ptolemais, sending one delegate to the Athenian Boule. There was an association among Conthyle, Cytherus, and Erchia.

Its site is located southeast of modern Spata.
