= Oenoe (Marathon) =

Coordinates: 38°09′22″N 23°55′58″E

Oenoe (Ancient Greek: Οἰνόη, romanized: Oinoē) was one of four demoi of ancient Athens situated in the small plain of Marathon open to the sea between Mount Parnes and Mount Pentelicus, originally formed with the other three demoi (Marathon, Probalinthus, and Tricorythus), the Attic Tetrapolis, one of the twelve ancient divisions of ancient Attica. Oenoe belonged to the tribe Aeantis, and Lucian speaks of the area as "the parts of Marathon about Oenoe" (Μαραθῶνος τὰ περὶ τὴν Οἰνόην).

The site of Oenoe is near Ninoï, Marathonas.
