= Porus (Attica) =

Coordinates: 37°46′55″N 23°58′55″E

Porus or Poros (Ancient Greek: Πόρος) was a deme of ancient Attica, originally of the phyle of Acamantis but after 307/6 BCE, of the phyle of Demetrias, sending three delegates to the Athenian Boule.

Its site is tentatively located near modern Metropisi.
