= Aphidna =

Ancient Athenian town

Coordinates: 38°11′14″N 23°52′45″E

Aphidna (Greece)

Aphidna (Ancient Greek: Ἄφιδνα) or Aphidnae or Aphidnai (Ἀφίδναι) was one of the twelve ancient towns of ancient Attica. It was celebrated in the mythical period as the place where Theseus deposited Helen of Troy, entrusting her to the care of his friend Aphidnus. When the Dioscuri invaded Attica in search of their sister, the inhabitants of Deceleia informed the Lacedaemonians where Helen was concealed, and showed them the way to Aphidna. The Dioscuri thereupon took the town, and carried off their sister. We learn, from a decree quoted by Demosthenes, that Aphidna was, in his time, a fortified town, and at a greater distance than 120 stadia from Athens. As an Attic deme, it belonged in succession to the tribes Aeantis, Leontis, Ptolemais, and Hadrianis.

The site of Aphidna is located at Kotroni near the modern town of Afidnes.

== Archaeological excavations at Aphidia ==
=== History of excavations ===
The first Swedish fieldwork in Greece took place between June and August 1894 when archaeologist Sam Wide and Lennart Kjellberg excavated at Kalaureia. Having finished their campaign there, they returned to Athens where Kjellberg began working on the publication. Wide, on the other hand, was eager for further fieldwork opportunities and therefore visited the site of Aphidna together with German archaeologist Heinrich Bulle.

They found Mycenaean sherds as well as three tombs and a tumulus in the area and Wide assumed that it had been the location of a Mycenean fortress and tholos tombs. Wide started the excavations during the end of October the same year. One long trench from east to west revealed thirteen tombs, some of them unusually rich even though the southern part of the tumulus had been disturbed with only the lower strata remaining intact. The results from the excavations were published by Wide alone.

=== Archaeological finds ===
The tumulus excavated by Wide at Aphidna was around 24 meters in diameter and surrounded by a stone circle laid from end to end using elliptical stones. The mound has usually been dated to the Middle Bronze Age (2000–1600 BC), but Jeannette Forsén has suggested that it may have been constructed during the earlier period EB II (c. 2700–2200 BC). Forsén's theory is based on the similarities of construction with an EB II tumulus found on top of the earlier “House of the Tiles”, another archaeological site, at Lerna. Some finds in the fill of the Aphidna tumulus, such as the spout of a zoomorphic clay rhyton (conical container from which fluids were intended to be drunk or to be poured), are also likely to date to the Early Bronze Age (EB).

The graves thirteen excavated in the tumulus included five shaft-graves, often covered with stone slabs. Two cist-graves (the sides of which were constructed by stone slabs) and six pithos burials (burials where a large storage vessel was used as a container for the dead). The shaft-grave, Grave I, contained the sparse unburnt remains of a single inhumation was found, as well as three bronze rings, fragments of silver and bronze vessels, six spindle-whorls and many beads in various material and shapes. The pottery found consisted of several gray ware vessels. Based on the presence of spindle-whorls the deceased probably was a woman. The pithos burial, Grave III, contained the cranium of the dead and a large number of grave offerings. In close proximity to the skull six gold rings were found (three of which had once formed a chain) as well as one silver ring. It is possible that the short chain was used as an earring or a hairband. A wide range of ceramic vessels, most of them described as grey ware, were also found. Among other things a composite vessel, a pedestal-footed pyxis, a bowl and two cups of grey burnished ware were found.

== See also ==
- List of ancient Greek cities
- Swedish Institute at Athens

== Sources ==
- Swedish Institute at Athens - Aphidna, Attica: https://www.sia.gr/en/articles.php?tid=365&page=1
