= Eitea =

Eitea (Ancient Greek: Εἰτέα) may refer to either of two demoi of ancient Attica:

- Eitea (Acamantis), of the phyle of Acamantis, and later of Antigonis and Hadrianis
- Eitea (Antiochis), of the phyle of Antiochis
