= Potamus (Attica) =

Potamus or Potamos (Ancient Greek: Ποταμός) was the name of several demoi of ancient Attica. They lay on the east coast north of Thoricus, and were once a populous place: they were celebrated as containing the sepulchre of Ion. The port of Potamus was probably the one which received the Peloponnesian fleet in 411 BCE.

The demoi were: Potamus Deiradiotes, Potamus Hypenerthen, and Potamus Kathyperthen.
