= Icarium =

Icarium may refer to:

- Icarium (Attica), a deme of ancient Attica, Greece
- A character in a series of books; see List of Malazan Book of the Fallen characters
