= Colonae (Attica) =

Colonae or Kolonai (Ancient Greek: Κολωναί) may refer to either of two demoi of ancient Attica:

- Colonae (Antiochis), of the phyle of Antiochis, and later of Antigonis and Ptolemais
- Colonae (Leontis), of the phyle of Leontis
