= Themacus =

Deme of ancient Attica

Themacus or Themakos (Ancient Greek: Θημακός) was a deme of ancient Attica, originally of the phyle of Erechtheis but after 224/223 BCE, the phyle of Ptolemais, sending one delegate to the Athenian Boule.

Its site is unlocated.
