= Teithras =

Coordinates: 38°00′17″N 23°56′32″E

Teithras (Ancient Greek: Τείθρας) or Tithras (Τίθρας) was a deme of ancient Attica, of the phyle of Aegeis, sending four delegates to the Athenian Boule.

As evidenced by the discovery of a sacred calendar, the deme revered Athena, Zeus, Heracles, Kore, and the heroes Datylus and Teithras. There was also a sanctuary of Dionysus, in which theatrical performances took place. In ancient times the dried figs produced in this deme were famous.

In The Frogs by Aristophanes, the "Gorgons of Teithras" are characters invented by Aeacus to scare Dionysus. The playwright probably referred to the women of the deme, who were considered terrible and ugly by contemporary Athenians.

Its site is located near modern Pikermi.
