= Cothocidae =

Deme of ancient Attica

Coordinates: 38°05′51″N 23°35′23″E

Cothocidae or Kothokidai (Ancient Greek: Κοθωκίδαι) was a deme of ancient Attica, originally of the phyle of Oeneis, but between 307/306 BCE and 201/200 BCE of the phyle of Demetrias, sending two delegates to the Athenian Boule.

Its site is tentatively located near Ag. Ioannes, north of modern Aspropyrgos.
