= Lamptrai =

Lamptrai (Ancient Greek: Λαμπτραὶ), or Lamptra (Λάμπτρα, in inscriptions; Λάμπρα, in writers), was the name of two demoi or ancient Attica, Upper Lamptrai (Lamptrai Kathyperthen), and Lower or Maritime Lamptrai (Lamptrai Paraloi). These places were between Anagyrus, Thorae, and Aegilia.
