= Eroeadae =

Eroeadae or Eroiadai (Ancient Greek: Ἐροιάδαι) may refer to either of two demoi of ancient Attica:

- Eroeadae (Antiochis), of the phyle of Antiochis
- Eroeadae (Hippothontis), of the phyle of Hippothontis
