= Prospalta (Attica) =

Ancient Athenian deme

Coordinates: 37°50′54″N 23°54′44″E

Prospalta (Ancient Greek: Πρόσπαλτα) was a deme of ancient Attica in the phyle Acamantis. It lay in the interior, between Zoster and Potamus.

Its site is located northwest of modern Kalyvia Thorikou.
