= Phegaea (Aigeis) =

Coordinates: 38°04′11″N 23°58′17″E

Phegaea or Phegaia (Ancient Greek: Φηγαία) was a deme of ancient Attica in the phyle of Aigeis. The Suda places Phegaea in the phyle of Aeantis.

Phegaea's site is tentatively located near modern Ierotsakouli.
