= Colonae (Antiochis) =

Deme in ancient Attica

Coordinates: 38°11′57″N 23°55′06″E

Colonae or Kolonai (Ancient Greek: Κολωναί) was a deme in ancient Attica, originally of the phyle of Antiochis, but later in the phylae of Antigonis (307/6 – 224/3 BCE) and Ptolemais (after 224/3 BCE).

Its site is tentatively located near modern Varnava Tower.
