= Ptelea (Attica) =

Greek Attica

Ptelea (Ancient Greek: Πτελέα) was a deme of ancient Attica of the phyle Oineis, sending one delegate to the Athenian Boule. It is the setting for Menander's Heros.

The site of Ptelea is in the Kephisos valley, west of modern Athens. Traill notes there is scant evidence that would help to offer a precise location as the main evidence for the deme comes from the findspot of a grave marker.
