= Phyle (Attica) =

Coordinates: 38°08′24″N 23°38′13″E

Phyle (Ancient Greek: Φυλή) was a strong fortress and deme of ancient Attica, on a steep rock, commanding the narrow pass across Mount Parnes, through which runs the direct road from Thebes to Attica, past Acharnae. On the northern side of the pass was the territory of Tanagra. Phyle is situated at a distance of more than 120 stadia from Attica, not 100 stadia, as Diodorus states, and was one of the strongest Attican fortresses on the Boeotian frontier. The precipitous rock upon which it stands can only be approached by a ridge on the eastern side. It is memorable in history as the place seized by Thrasybulus and the Athenian exiles in Battle of Phyle in 404 BCE, and from which they commenced their operations against the Thirty Tyrants. The height of Phyle commanded views of the whole Attican plain, of the city itself, of Mount Hymettus, and the Saronic Gulf. In Phyle there was a building called the Daphnephoreion, containing a picture, which represented the Thargelia.

The site of Phyle is located within the bounds of modern Fyli.
