= Hippotomadae =

Hippotomadae or Hippotomadai (Ancient Greek: Ἱπποτομάδαι) was a deme of ancient Attica, of the phyle Oeneis, and between 307/6 BCE and 201/200 BCE of Demetrias, sending one delegate to the Athenian Boule.

Its site is unlocated.
