= Paeania =

Administrative district in ancient Greece

Paeania or Paiania (Ancient Greek: Παιανία) were two demoi of ancient Attica, divided into Upper Paeania and Lower Paeania, that were situated on the eastern side of Hymettus, near the modern village of Liopesi renamed to Paiania. It was the deme of Demosthenes.

== Notable people ==
- Demades (380–318 BCE), orator and demagogue.
- Demosthenes (384–322 BCE), orator and demagogue.
- Philippides of Paiania (293 BCE), archon Basileus and son of Philomelos.
