= Myrrhinutta =

Coordinates: 38°04′59″N 23°58′44″E

Myrrhinutta or Myrrinoutta (Ancient Greek: Μυρρινοῦττα) was a deme of ancient Attica, of the phyle of Aegeis, sending one delegate to the Athenian Boule.

Its site is located near modern Nea Makri.
