= Elaeus (Attica) =

Coordinates: 38°04′59″N 23°31′58″E

Elaeus or Elaious (Ancient Greek: Ἐλαιοῦς) was a deme of ancient Attica.

The site of Elaeus is tentatively located east of Magoula.
