= Thriasio Plain =

Plain in western Attica, Greece

Coordinates: 38.078°N 23.583°E

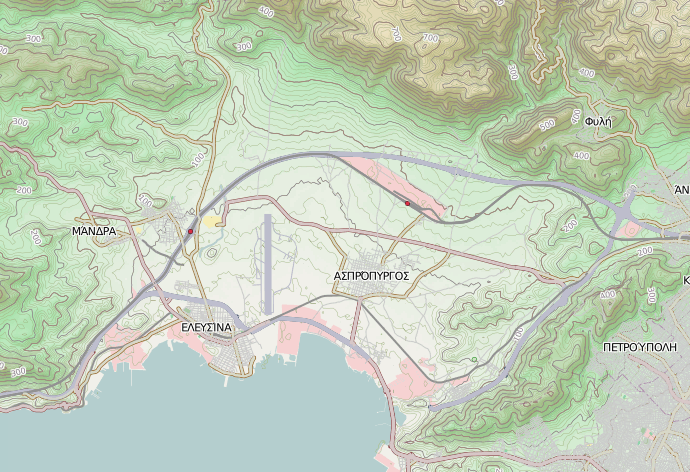
Topographic map of the Thriasio Plain.

The Thriasio Plain (Greek: Θριάσιο Πεδίο, romanized: Thriasio Pedio) is a plain in western Attica within Athens metropolitan area in Greece. It is bounded by Mount Egaleo to the east, Mount Parnitha to the north, Mount Pateras to the west, and the Bay of Elefsina to the south.

== History ==
The Thriasio Plain owes its name to the ancient deme of Thria (Greek: Θρία), one of the demes of ancient Athens. The largest town in the plain was Eleusis (modern-day Elefsina), location of the famous Eleusinian Mysteries. In Greek mythology, when the goddess Athena won the contest for control of Attica over Poseidon, Poseidon flooded the plain in wrath, until called to order by Zeus.

In antiquity, as today, the area was connected to central Athens by two passes: the Sacred Way (Greek: Ιερά Οδός) to the west, today used by the main Athens–Corinth highway, and another pass to the northwest nowadays used by the Attiki Odos highway. During the Peloponnesian War (431–404 BC) the Thriasio Plain was ravaged by the Spartan army of King Archidamus II in his campaign against the Athenians.

== Modern times ==
Today it is largely an industrial area, hosting some of Greece's major industrial facilities, such as its largest oil refineries and steel mills. There are four cities in the Thriasio Plain: Elefsina (anc. Eleusis), Mandra, Magoula, and Aspropyrgos. The plain hosts a major air force base outside of Elefsina, as well as a major station of the Athens Suburban Rail. As of 2010, there are plans to create a major center for the transshipment of commercial goods unloaded in the nearby port of Pireas (Athens port) to the rest of Greece and neighboring countries.

== Climate ==
The Thriasio plain has a Mediterranean climate (Köppen climate classification: Csa) bordering a hot semi-arid climate (Köppen climate classification: BSh) with mild winters and very hot summers. The Thriasio Plain is particularly vulnerable to high temperatures due to its topography and has experienced the highest temperatures ever recorded in Greece and continental Europe with 48.0 °C in Elefsina and 47.5 °C in Aspropyrgos in 1977 and 2007 respectively.

Climate data for Elefsina Port 10 m a.s.l.
Month	Jan	Feb	Mar	Apr	May	Jun	Jul	Aug	Sep	Oct	Nov	Dec	Year
Record high °C (°F)	24.9 (76.8)	22.8 (73.0)	25.8 (78.4)	31.4 (88.5)	37.4 (99.3)	45.3 (113.5)	44.8 (112.6)	43.7 (110.7)	38.4 (101.1)	32.8 (91.0)	29.1 (84.4)	22.2 (72.0)	45.3 (113.5)
Mean daily maximum °C (°F)	13.8 (56.8)	15.5 (59.9)	18.0 (64.4)	22.2 (72.0)	26.5 (79.7)	31.4 (88.5)	34.6 (94.3)	34.1 (93.4)	29.7 (85.5)	24.7 (76.5)	20.1 (68.2)	15.8 (60.4)	23.9 (75.0)
Daily mean °C (°F)	10.2 (50.4)	11.6 (52.9)	13.7 (56.7)	17.5 (63.5)	21.8 (71.2)	26.7 (80.1)	30.0 (86.0)	29.8 (85.6)	25.5 (77.9)	20.9 (69.6)	16.6 (61.9)	12.3 (54.1)	19.7 (67.5)
Mean daily minimum °C (°F)	6.6 (43.9)	7.7 (45.9)	9.4 (48.9)	12.8 (55.0)	17.1 (62.8)	21.9 (71.4)	25.3 (77.5)	25.5 (77.9)	21.3 (70.3)	17.0 (62.6)	13.0 (55.4)	8.8 (47.8)	15.5 (59.9)
Record low °C (°F)	−2.0 (28.4)	−1.1 (30.0)	0.2 (32.4)	4.6 (40.3)	11.8 (53.2)	14.7 (58.5)	19.3 (66.7)	19.7 (67.5)	12.9 (55.2)	8.3 (46.9)	4.5 (40.1)	0.6 (33.1)	−2.0 (28.4)
Average rainfall mm (inches)	60.4 (2.38)	33.6 (1.32)	24.6 (0.97)	20.3 (0.80)	19.4 (0.76)	33.1 (1.30)	11.1 (0.44)	10.5 (0.41)	32.3 (1.27)	28.9 (1.14)	65.6 (2.58)	57.5 (2.26)	397.3 (15.63)
Source: National Observatory of Athens Monthly Bulletins (Mar 2016-Apr 2024) and World Meteorological Organization

Climate data for Aspropyrgos 45 m a.s.l.
Month	Jan	Feb	Mar	Apr	May	Jun	Jul	Aug	Sep	Oct	Nov	Dec	Year
Record high °C (°F)	23.7 (74.7)	23.6 (74.5)	25.7 (78.3)	31.2 (88.2)	37.7 (99.9)	44.6 (112.3)	44.9 (112.8)	44.8 (112.6)	40.8 (105.4)	32.7 (90.9)	28.3 (82.9)	22.4 (72.3)	44.9 (112.8)
Mean daily maximum °C (°F)	13.6 (56.5)	15.2 (59.4)	17.7 (63.9)	21.9 (71.4)	26.5 (79.7)	31.8 (89.2)	34.9 (94.8)	34.1 (93.4)	29.9 (85.8)	24.6 (76.3)	20.1 (68.2)	15.7 (60.3)	23.8 (74.9)
Daily mean °C (°F)	9.9 (49.8)	11.4 (52.5)	13.6 (56.5)	17.2 (63.0)	21.7 (71.1)	26.9 (80.4)	30.1 (86.2)	29.7 (85.5)	25.6 (78.1)	20.6 (69.1)	16.4 (61.5)	12.2 (54.0)	19.6 (67.3)
Mean daily minimum °C (°F)	6.1 (43.0)	7.6 (45.7)	9.4 (48.9)	12.5 (54.5)	16.9 (62.4)	22.0 (71.6)	25.3 (77.5)	25.3 (77.5)	21.2 (70.2)	16.8 (62.2)	12.7 (54.9)	8.7 (47.7)	15.4 (59.7)
Record low °C (°F)	−2.5 (27.5)	−1.1 (30.0)	−0.1 (31.8)	4.3 (39.7)	11.5 (52.7)	14.3 (57.7)	18.2 (64.8)	19.9 (67.8)	13.9 (57.0)	8.2 (46.8)	4.4 (39.9)	0.3 (32.5)	−2.5 (27.5)
Average rainfall mm (inches)	52.3 (2.06)	40.6 (1.60)	28.9 (1.14)	20.2 (0.80)	14.3 (0.56)	18.3 (0.72)	5.5 (0.22)	7.9 (0.31)	31.0 (1.22)	32.7 (1.29)	54.4 (2.14)	71.8 (2.83)	377.9 (14.89)
Source: National Observatory of Athens Monthly Bulletins (Dec 2014-Jul 2025) and World Meteorological Organization

Climate data for Vlychada 68 m a.s.l.
Month	Jan	Feb	Mar	Apr	May	Jun	Jul	Aug	Sep	Oct	Nov	Dec	Year
Record high °C (°F)	25.3 (77.5)	22.9 (73.2)	27.1 (80.8)	30.9 (87.6)	37.3 (99.1)	40.2 (104.4)	44.9 (112.8)	43.5 (110.3)	39.5 (103.1)	31.7 (89.1)	30.4 (86.7)	22.5 (72.5)	44.9 (112.8)
Mean daily maximum °C (°F)	14.9 (58.8)	15.9 (60.6)	17.3 (63.1)	22.1 (71.8)	27.1 (80.8)	31.5 (88.7)	35.7 (96.3)	35.0 (95.0)	30.3 (86.5)	25.3 (77.5)	20.6 (69.1)	17.1 (62.8)	24.4 (75.9)
Daily mean °C (°F)	11.0 (51.8)	11.6 (52.9)	12.8 (55.0)	17.0 (62.6)	21.7 (71.1)	26.1 (79.0)	30.3 (86.5)	29.8 (85.6)	25.7 (78.3)	21.0 (69.8)	16.9 (62.4)	13.6 (56.5)	19.8 (67.6)
Mean daily minimum °C (°F)	7.1 (44.8)	7.3 (45.1)	8.2 (46.8)	11.8 (53.2)	16.2 (61.2)	20.6 (69.1)	24.9 (76.8)	24.6 (76.3)	21.0 (69.8)	16.7 (62.1)	13.2 (55.8)	10.0 (50.0)	15.1 (59.2)
Record low °C (°F)	−1.1 (30.0)	−0.7 (30.7)	−0.7 (30.7)	3.8 (38.8)	10.6 (51.1)	12.8 (55.0)	19.5 (67.1)	19.2 (66.6)	12.6 (54.7)	11.9 (53.4)	4.7 (40.5)	1.2 (34.2)	−1.1 (30.0)
Average rainfall mm (inches)	61.2 (2.41)	30.7 (1.21)	26.3 (1.04)	23.3 (0.92)	13.3 (0.52)	30.6 (1.20)	2.7 (0.11)	16.4 (0.65)	28.3 (1.11)	20.3 (0.80)	40.1 (1.58)	60.2 (2.37)	353.4 (13.92)
Source 1: National Observatory of Athens Monthly Bulletins (Apr 2020 - Apr 2024)
Source 2: Vlychada N.O.A station, World Meteorological Organization

Climate data for North Magoula, Metropolitan Athens 157 m a.s.l.
Month	Jan	Feb	Mar	Apr	May	Jun	Jul	Aug	Sep	Oct	Nov	Dec	Year
Record high °C (°F)	23.3 (73.9)	23.9 (75.0)	28.2 (82.8)	31.6 (88.9)	40.5 (104.9)	42.9 (109.2)	43.8 (110.8)	45.9 (114.6)	39.8 (103.6)	34.0 (93.2)	28.6 (83.5)	23.8 (74.8)	45.9 (114.6)
Mean daily maximum °C (°F)	14.2 (57.6)	15.4 (59.7)	18.6 (65.5)	22.6 (72.7)	28.1 (82.6)	33.9 (93.0)	36.5 (97.7)	35.9 (96.6)	31.1 (88.0)	25.4 (77.7)	20.0 (68.0)	15.9 (60.6)	24.8 (76.6)
Daily mean °C (°F)	9.5 (49.1)	10.2 (50.4)	12.7 (54.9)	16.3 (61.3)	21.3 (70.3)	27.0 (80.6)	29.8 (85.6)	29.3 (84.7)	25.0 (77.0)	20.1 (68.2)	15.4 (59.7)	11.4 (52.5)	19.0 (66.2)
Mean daily minimum °C (°F)	4.7 (40.5)	5.1 (41.2)	6.8 (44.2)	9.9 (49.8)	14.5 (58.1)	20.1 (68.2)	23.0 (73.4)	22.7 (72.9)	18.8 (65.8)	14.8 (58.6)	10.9 (51.6)	7.0 (44.6)	13.2 (55.7)
Record low °C (°F)	−4.1 (24.6)	−1.9 (28.6)	−2.6 (27.3)	1.4 (34.5)	8.6 (47.5)	11.8 (53.2)	16.6 (61.9)	17.8 (64.0)	9.5 (49.1)	5.3 (41.5)	1.9 (35.4)	−1.8 (28.8)	−4.1 (24.6)
Source: National Observatory of Athens (Jul 2018- Jul 2025)
