= Oeum Deceleicum =

Coordinates: 38°08′28″N 23°51′59″E

Oeum Deceleicum or Oion Dekeleikon (Ancient Greek: Οἶον Δεκελεικόν) was a deme of ancient Attica near Deceleia, so called to distinguish it from the Oeum Cerameicum.

The site of Oeum Deceleicum is located near modern Bogiati.
