= Laciadae =

Ancient Athenian deme

Laciadae or Lakiadai (Ancient Greek: Λακιάδαι) was a deme of ancient Attica on the Sacred Way between Sciron and the Cephissus, and near the sacred fig-tree. It is celebrated as the deme to which the family of Miltiades and Cimon belonged. It took its name from the Attic hero Lacius.

The site of Laciadae is tentatively located at 37°59′36″N 23°41′59″E.
