= Otryne =

Otryne (Ancient Greek: Ὀτρύνη) was a deme of ancient Attica, of the phyle of Aegeis, sending one delegate to the Athenian Boule.

Its site is unlocated.
