= Phegus =

Phegus or Phegous (Ancient Greek: Φηγοῦς) was a deme of ancient Attica, of the phyle of Erechtheis, sending one delegate to the Athenian Boule.

Its site is unlocated.
