= Aegilia (Attica) =

Coordinates: 37°47′33″N 23°54′35″E

Aegilia or Aigilia (Ancient Greek: Αἰγιλία), or Aegilus or Aigilos (ἡ Αἵγιλος), was a deme of ancient Attica belonging to the phyle of Antiochis, situated on the western coast between Lamptra and Sphettus. It was celebrated for its figs.

The site of Aegilia is tentatively located at modern Phoinikia.
