= Anaphlystus =

Deme of ancient Athens

Coordinates: 37°43′38″N 23°57′03″E

Anaphlystus or Anaphlystos (Ancient Greek: Ἀνάφλυστος) was a coastal (paralia) deme of ancient Athens, belonging to the Antiochis phyle, on the west coast of Attica, opposite the island of Eleussa, and a little north of the promontory of Sunium, between that promontory and that of Astypalaea. It bordered on Aegilia to the west, to Atene in the south-east and to Amphitrope to the east. To the northwest, it was separated from Phrearrhioi by the Astike Hodos.

It was a place of some importance. It had ten representatives in the Boule. Xenophon recommended the erection of a fortress here for the protection of the mines of Sunium. Strabo speaks of a paneium (Πανεῖον), or Grotto of Pan, in the neighbourhood of Anaphlystus.

It was situated at a site called Agios Georgios (St. George), close to the modern settlement of Anavyssos, on the Athens Riviera.
