= Besa (Attica) =

Coordinates: 37°43′28″N 23°59′46″E

Besa (Ancient Greek: Βῆσα) was a deme of ancient Athens, situated in the mining district, midway between Anaphlystus and Thoricus, and 300 stadia from Athens main city. Xenophon recommended the erection of a fortress at Besa, which would thus connect the two fortresses situated respectively at Anaphlystus and Thoricus.

The site of Besa is located near the modern Synterina.
