= Probalinthus =

Coordinates: 38°07′18″N 23°56′56″E

Probalinthus or Probalinthos (Ancient Greek: Προβάλινθος) was a deme of ancient Attica, one of the Attic Tetrapolis (along with Marathon, Tricorythus, and Oenoe) located in the plain of Marathon. Probalinthus belonged to the phyle Pandionis.

The site of Probalinthus is located southeast of modern Vrana.
