= Cedi (Attica) =

Deme (suburb) of ancient Attica

Coordinates: 37°56′13″N 23°45′03″E

Cedi or Kedoi (Ancient Greek: Κηδοί) was a deme of ancient Attica, of the phyle of Erechtheis, sending two delegates to the Boule.

Its site is tentatively located near modern Ilioupoli.
