= Oeum Cerameicum =

Oeum Cerameicum or Oion Kerameikon (Ancient Greek: Οἶον Κεραμεικὸν) was a deme of ancient Attica. It was surnamed to distinguish it from Oeum Deceleicum near Deceleia. Its name shows that it was near the outer Kerameikos.

Its site is unlocated.
