= Cholargos (deme) =

Deme of Ancient Athens

Coordinates: 38°03′23″N 23°44′21″E

Not to be confused with present-day northeastern Athenian municipality of Cholargos.

Cholargos (Ancient Greek: Χολαργός, romanized: Cholargós) was a deme of ancient Athens located west or north-west of Athens main city.

== Description ==
The fact that Cholargos belongs to a city trittys, despite its location away from the city, may suggest that the deme was quite important and was more urbanized than others. Cholargos is one of the few demes who had their own Thesmophoria. An inscription was recovered that contains references to archousae, women who assisted the priestess and provided grain, oil, wine and money; and shows that the priestess was paid four drachmas for her services. The deme also had a circular sanctuary of Heracles.

The site of Cholargos is located near modern Kato Liosia.
