= Oa (Attica) =

Subdivision of ancient Attica, Greece

Coordinates: 37°59′10″N 23°53′09″E

Oa, also Oae or Oai, (Ancient Greek: Ὄα or Ὀά ) was a deme of ancient Attica, originally of the phyle of Pandionis, but after 127/8 AD, of the phyle of Hadrianis, sending four delegates to the Athenian Boule.

Its site is located near modern Papangelaki.
