= Phegaea (Pandionis) =

Phegaea or Phegaia (Ancient Greek: Φηγαία) was a deme of ancient Attica in the phyle of Pandionis.

Its location is unknown, although some conjecture a site near Oropia.
