= Sypalettus =

Ancient Attic deme

Coordinates: 38°04′19″N 23°45′35″E

Sypalettus or Sypalettos (Ancient Greek: Συπαληττός) was a deme in ancient Attica of the phyle of Cecropis, sending two delegates to the Athenian Boule.

Probably Sypalettus was a divided deme, even if this hypothesis is not confirmed by all scholars. The inscription that suggests the placement of the deme is a sacred calendar of 470-460 BCE; this document it is very important because it is the first Attican written text that prohibits changes to the law.

Its site is located near Nea Ionia (formerly, Kukuvaones).
