= Antinoeis =

Antinoeis (Ancient Greek: Ἀντινοείς) was a deme of ancient Attica, in the part of the city founded by the emperor Hadrian. The deme was established only in 126 or 127, after the death of Antinous, a favourite of Hadrian.

The site of Antinoeis is unlocated.
