= Eitea (Antiochis) =

Coordinates: 38°12′10″N 23°58′03″E

Eitea (Ancient Greek: Εἰτέα) was a deme of ancient Attica, of the phyle of Antiochis.

Its site is located near modern Grammatiko.
