= Erchia =

Ancient Athenian deme

Coordinates: 37°58′02″N 23°55′07″E

Erchia or Erkhia (Ancient Greek: Ἐρχία; (Note: Romanization: Erkhía, Ancient: [erkʰía] Modern: [erˈçia]) also spelled Ἔρχεια and Ἑρχιά) was a deme of ancient Attica, of the phyle of Aegeis, sending six or seven delegates to the Athenian Boule, but eleven delegates after 307/6 BCE. According to Stephanus of Byzantium, in Greek mythology, the name comes from an inhabitant of the deme who hosted Demeter.

== History ==
Much of what is known about Erchia comes from a lex sacra (sacred law) of the deme. In it are listed 59 annual sacrifices to 46 divinities (gods, nymphs and heroes), for a total cost of 547 drachmae; 21 of these sacrifices were made in the deme itself, the other 38 in the neighboring demoi or in Athens.

From its central location within Attica, and the wealth and positions held by many of its inhabitants (whose peak period, judging by the information available, seems to be between approximately 450 BCE and 200 BCE) and from the number of its delegates to the Athenian Boule, more than any other deme of the phyle Aegeis, it can be assumed that Erchia was one of the most important demoi.

In Erchia there was a shrine of Hecate.

== Location ==
Its position is known thanks to the discovery of the lex sacra, and the construction of the modern Athenian airport, which was built over the deme.

== Notable people ==
- Isocrates, rhetorician, and orator
- Xenophon, philosopher, historian, soldier, mercenary, and student of Socrates
