= Upper Agryle =

Coordinates: 37°57′40″N 23°45′29″E

Upper Agryle, or Agryle Kathyperthen (Ancient Greek: Ἀγρυλὴ καθύπερθεν), was a deme of ancient Attica, one of two demoi of Agryle.

The site of Upper Agryle is located southwest of modern Ardettos.
