= Colonae (Leontis) =

Ancient Athenian deme (Leontis)

Coordinates: 38°07′41″N 23°53′44″E

Colonae or Kolonai (Ancient Greek: Κολωναί) was a deme in ancient Attica of the phyle of Leontis, sending two delegates to the Athenian Boule.

Its site is tentatively located near modern Michaleza.
