= Epicephisia =

Ancient Athenian deme

Coordinates: 38°00′05″N 23°42′12″E

Epicephisia or Epikephisia (Ancient Greek: Ἐπικηφισία) was a deme of ancient Attica in the phyle of Oeneis.

The deme was small and unimportant, providing only one or two Bouleutai to the Athenian Boule. However it housed a branch of the Salaminae family, originating from Salamis. This aristocratic clan was based on a sacred alliance and presided over some of the oldest cults of Athens, such as those of Athena, Aglaurus, and Pandrosus.

Another noble family of Epicephisia were the Aphidantidae, who claimed to descend from Apheidas, king of Athens and great-grandson of Theseus.

Epicephisia also had its own dikasterion, a court of justice, and its own legal officers.

The site of Epicephisia is located in the Kephisos valley, west of modern Athens.
