= Lower Pergase =

Coordinates: 38°05′41″N 23°47′37″E

Lower Pergase or Pergase Hypenerthen (Ancient Greek: Περγασή ὑπένερθεν) was a deme in ancient Attica of the phyle of Erechtheis.

Its site is located near modern Chelidonou.
