= Upper Paeania =

Coordinates: 37°58′29″N 23°50′38″E

Upper Paeania or Paiania Kathyperthen (Ancient Greek: Παιανία καθύπερθεν) was a deme of ancient Attica; it was located on the eastern side of Hymettus. One of two demoi named Paeania.

The site of Upper Paeania is located north of modern Liopesi.
