= Daedalidae =

Coordinates: 37°57′25″N 23°45′00″E

Daedalidae or Daidalidai (Ancient Greek: Δαιδαλίδαι) was a deme of ancient Attica, located north of Alopece, southeast of Athens. The name "Daedalidae" was often used to refer to the most skilled sculptors in allusion to Daedalus, the labyrinth builder of Knossos. Socrates, in two dialogues of Plato, claims to descend from Daedalus, most likely exploiting this allusion, in which his ancestors would have been sculptors. In Daedalidae, therefore, a craftsman named Daedalus could have been revered as an eponymous hero, which was most probably not the same as the Daedalus of mythology. Some sources note the presence of a sanctuary called Dedaleion.

The site of Daedalidae is located north of Alopeke.
