= Eroeadae (Hippothontis) =

Location in ancient Attica

Coordinates: 38°00′53″N 23°38′47″E

Eroeadae or Eroiadai (Ancient Greek: Ἐροιάδαι) was a deme in ancient Attica of the phyle of Hippothontis, sending one delegate to the Athenian Boule.

Its site is located near modern Chaidari.
