= Cerameis =

Deme of ancient Attica

Coordinates: 37°58′41″N 23°43′08″E

Cerameis or Kerameis (Ancient Greek: Κεραμεῖς) was a deme of ancient Attica, located in the center of Athens, northeast of the Dipylon Gate, which extended both inside and outside the city walls. In its territory lay an important necropolis.

== Etymology ==
According to Pausanias the name of the deme came from Ceramus, son of Dionysus and Ariadne, while Herodotus claims that the name derives from the term κέραμος (kèramos, "terracotta" or "ceramics"), due to the numerous clay deposits and potters' shops in the area.

== Description ==
The place was called one of the most beautiful places in Athens, and it was important for the festival of Panathenaic Games, whose procession stopped outside the Dipylon Gate, for the procession of the Eleusinian Mysteries and for the torch of the Promethians, which passed through here before reaching the Acropolis.

According to tradition, Androgeus, son of Minos, was murdered here; his murder led to the custom of sacrificing seven boys and seven girls a year to the Minotaur.

Diogenes lived here for a long time and, according to a legend, once prayed to the many statues present in the deme to be able to endure a defeat. Also in this deme the tyrant Hipparchus was killed by Harmodius and Aristogeiton: in their honor a statue was erected near the Gate.

The site of Ceremeis is located northwest of Dipylon.
