= Coastal Lamptrai =

Deme of ancient Attica

Coordinates: 37°50′55″N 23°49′55″E

Coastal Lamptrai, or Lamptrai Paraliai (Ancient Greek: Λαμπτραὶ παράλιαι) or Lamptra Paralios (Λάμπτρα παράλιος), also known as Lamptrai Hypenerthen (Λαμπτραὶ ὑπένερθεν) or Lamptra Hypenerthen (Λάμπτρα ὑπένερθεν), both meaning Lower Lamptra[i], was a deme of ancient Attica. Lamptrai Paraloi and nearby Upper Lamptrai (Lamptrai Kathyperthen) were between Anagyrus, Thorae, and Aegilia. At Lamptra, the grave of Cranaus was shown.

The site of Coastal Lamptrai was near modern Kitsi.
