= Trinemeia =

Coordinates: 38°04′45″N 23°51′10″E

Trinemeia (Ancient Greek: Τρινέμεια) was a deme of ancient Attica at which one of the minor branches of the Cephissus takes its rise.

Trinemeia's site is tentatively located near modern Kokkinaras.
