= Eroeadae (Antiochis) =

Deme in ancient Athens

Eroeadae or Eroiadai (Ancient Greek: Ἐροιάδαι) was a deme in ancient Athens of the phyle of Antiochis.

Its site is unlocated.
