= Ericea =

Deme of ancient Attica

Coordinates: 38°00′10″N 23°44′27″E

Ericea or Erikeia (Ancient Greek: Ἐρίκεια) was a deme of ancient Attica, located near the modern Kypseli. The name of the deme probably derives from the erica plant, which grew abundantly in the hilly territory of the area.
