= Epieicidae =

Epieicidae or Epieikidai (Ancient Greek: Ἐπιεικίδαι) was a deme in ancient Attica of the phyle of Cecropis, sending one delegate to the Athenian Boule. In 303/2 BCE and in 281/0 BCE, no delegates of Epieicidae attended the Boule.

Its site is unlocated.
