= Lower Paeania =

Coordinates: 37°57′31″N 23°51′19″E

Lower Paeania or Paiania Hypenerthen (Ancient Greek: Παιανία ὑπένερθεν) was a deme of ancient Attica; it was located on the eastern side of Hymettus. One of two demoi named Paeania.

The site of Lower Paeania is located on the eastern outskirts of modern Liopesi.
