= Upper Lamptrai =

Coordinates: 37°52′41″N 23°51′23″E

Upper Lamptrai, or Lamptrai Kathyperthen (Ancient Greek: Λαμπτραὶ καθύπερθεν) or Lamptra Kathyperthen (Λάμπτρα καθύπερθεν), was a deme of ancient Attica. Lamptrai Kathyperthen and nearby Coastal Lamptrai (Lamptrai Paraloi) were between Anagyrus, Thorae, and Aegilia. At Lamptra, the grave of Cranaus was shown.

The site of Upper Lamptrai was near modern Lambrika.
