= Oenoe (Attica) =

Coordinates: 38°10′05″N 23°26′56″E

Oenoe or Oinoe (Ancient Greek: Οἰνόη) was a deme of Athens, situated upon the confines of Boeotia and Attica, near Eleutherae, and upon the regular road to Plataea and Thebes. Hysiae and Oenoe are mentioned as the frontier demes of Attica in 507 BC, when they were both taken by the Boeotians. From this time Hysiae continued to be a Boeotian town; but Oenoe was recovered by the Athenians, and was fortified by them before the commencement of the Peloponnesian War. In 411 BC, the Boeotians again obtained possession of Oenoe; but it must have been recovered a second time by the Athenians, as it continues to be mentioned as an Attic demus down to the latest times.

Oenoe was situated on the Pythian Way, so called because it led from Athens to Delphi: this road apparently branched off from the Sacred Way to Eleusis, near the tomb of Strato. Near Oenoe was a Pythium, or temple of Apollo Pythius, in consequence of the sanctity of which Oenoe obtained the epithet of the Sacred. This Pythium is said to have formed the northern boundary of the kingdom of Nisus, when Attica and the Megaris were divided among the four sons of Pandion II.

At the northwest extremity of Attica there is a narrow pass through Mount Cithaeron, through which ran the road from Thebes and Plataeae to Eleusis. This pass was known in antiquity by the name of the Three Heads, as the Boeotians called it, or the Oak's Heads, according to the Athenians. On the Attic side this pass was guarded by a strong fortress, of which the ruins form a conspicuous object, on the summit of a height, to the left of the road. They now bear the name of Ghyftókastro, or gipsy castle, a name frequently given to such buildings among the 19th century Greeks.

The site of Oenoe is near modern Inoï (Myupolis).
