= Upper Pergase =

Coordinates: 38°05′50″N 23°47′23″E

Upper Pergase or Pergase Kathyperthen (Ancient Greek: Περγασή καθύπερθεν) was a deme in ancient Attica of the phyle of Erechtheis.

Its site is located near modern Chelidonou.
