= Thria (Attica) =

Coordinates: 38°03′16″N 23°35′32″E

Thria (Ancient Greek: Θρία) was an important deme of ancient Athens, from which the Eleusinian plain, or, at all events, the central or eastern part of it, was called the Thriasian Plain (Θριάσιον πεδίον). When Attica was invaded from the west, the Thriasian Plain was the first to suffer from the ravages of the enemy. A portion of the Eleusinian plain was also called the Rharian Plain (Ράριον), in ancient times, but its site is unknown.

The territory of Thria appears to have been extended as far as the salt-springs Rheiti, since the temple of Aphrodite Phila is said to have been in Thria. The site of Thria is located southeast of modern Aspropyrgos.
