= Lower Agryle =

Coordinates: 37°57′38″N 23°44′14″E

Lower Agryle, or Agryle Hypenerthen (Ancient Greek: Ἀγρυλὴ ὑπένερθεν), was a deme of ancient Attica, one of two demoi of Agryle.

The site of Lower Agryle is located southwest of modern Ardettos.
