= Atene (deme) =

Coordinates: 37.68°N 23.96°E

Atene (Greek: Ἀτήνη) was a coastal (paralia) deme of Attica, belonging to the Antiochis tribe (phyle), with three representatives in the Boule.

It bordered Anaphlystus to the north and Amphitrope in the east, in what is now the southern part of Saronikos municipality.

It had an area of about 20 km^{2}, including the valleys of Charaka, Hagia Photini and Thimari as well as Gaidouronisi.

The area had been mostly uninhabited prior to the 5th century BC. The first epigraphic mention of Atene dates to 432 BC.

It prospered during the 5th to 4th centuries BC, with a dispersed settlement pattern, but was depopulated in the 3rd century BC, probably in the wake of the Chremonidean War.

== Sources ==
- Ameling, Walter (1995). "Ein südattischer Demos". Laverna. 6: 93–146.
- Hans Lohmann, Agriculture and country life in classical Attica (1992).
- Lohmann, Hans (1993). Atene: Forschungen zu Siedlungs- und Wirtschaftsstruktur des klassischen Attika = Atēnē. Köln: Böhlau Verlag. ISBN 9783412034924.
