= Semachidae =

Coordinates: 38°09′31″N 23°54′37″E

Semachidae or Semachidai (Ancient Greek: Σημαχίδαι) was a deme of ancient Athens, in the district of Epacria.

The site of Semachidae is tentatively located near modern Vredou.
