= Pallene (Attica) =

Coordinates: 38°03′59″N 23°42′41″E

Pallene (Ancient Greek: Παλλήνη) was a celebrated deme of ancient Athens, frequently mentioned by ancient writers and in inscriptions.

== Myth ==
The location is associated with a number of Greek myths. During the Gigantomachy, Athena slew the giant Pallas at the site, flayed him, and turned his skin into a cloak. Another version says that the victim was the Gorgon rather than Pallas. Later, Hephaestus attempted to rape Athena and got his sperm on her thigh. She wiped it off herself and onto the ground, where Gaia gave birth to Erichthonius. She put the baby in a basket and entrusted it to the daughters of Cecrops with strict instructions not to open it, then went to Pallene to get a rock that would form the foundations of a temple for her on the Acropolis. As she carried it back, a crow told her that the daughters of Cecrops had opened the basket and, in her rage, she dropped the rock on the ground, where it remains as Mount Lycabettus.

At a later stage, Eurystheus died fighting against the Athenians and Heracleidae at Pallene and was buried in front of the temple of Athena Pallenis.

According to myth, the Pallantidae went to war with their cousin Theseus. When Pallas was marching from Sphettus in the Mesogaea against Athens, he placed a body of his troops in ambush at Gargettus, under the command of his two sons, who were ordered, as soon as he was engaged with the army of Theseus, to march rapidly upon Athens and take the city by surprise, But the stratagem was revealed to Theseus by Leos of Hagnus, the herald of Pallas, whereupon Theseus cut to pieces the troops at Gargettus. In consequence of this a lasting enmity followed between the inhabitants of Pallene and Hagnous. After the battle, Theseus married his son Hippolytus to Pallas' sister Aricia.

== Location ==
Pallene was located near the Byzantine church of St. Stavros in the modern Athenian suburb of Gerakas.

The road from Sphettus to Athens passed through the opening between Mount Pentelicus and Mount Hymettus. A monastery there by the name of Ieraka (or Hieraka) is the site of Gargettus. We know further that Pallene lay on one of the roads from the city to Marathon.

== History ==
This location at the meeting point of several roads from the Mesogaea to Athens made Pallene strategically significant, and often occupied in military operations. Peisistratus' third attempt to seize control of Athens, culminated in a battle at Pallene in 536BC, in which he defeated the Alcmaeonidae.

Between the monastery of Ieraka and the small village of Charvati, a celebrated inscription respecting money due to temples was discovered, and which was probably placed in the temple of Athena Pallenis. In Ieraka there was also found the boustrophedon inscription of Aristocles, which probably also came from the same temple. In one of the churches nearby, George Finlay found an inscription referring to one "Xeophanes of Pallene" (ΞΕΟΦΑΝΗΣ ΠΑΛΛΗΝΕΥΣ).

== Sources ==
- Bultrighini, Ilaria. “Παραλία καì Μεσόγεια: ‘Coastalness’ and ‘Inlandness’ in the Ancient Greek World.” CHS Research Bulletin 1, no. 2 (2013). http://nrs.harvard.edu/urn-3:hlnc.essay:BultrighiniI.Paralia_kai_Mesogeia_Coastalness_and_Inlandness.2013
- Schlaifer, Robert (1943). "The Cult of Athena Pallenis: (Athenaeus VI 234-235)". Harvard Studies in Classical Philology. 54: 35–67. doi:10.2307/310911. JSTOR 310911.
- ToposText: Pallene (Attica) 22 Stavros - Παλλήνη
- Platonos-Yota, M. (1997). "The Sanctuary of Athena Pallenis". Archaiologia. 65: 92–97.
