= Cecrops =

Name associated with multiple figures in Greek mythology

In Greek mythology, Cecrops (/ˈsiːkrɒps/; Ancient Greek: Κέκροψ, Kékrops; gen.: Κέκροπος) may refer to two legendary kings of Athens:

- Cecrops I, the first king of Athens.
- Cecrops II, son of Pandion I, king of Athens.
- Cecrops, son of Hephaestus.
