= Icaria (Attica) =

Ancient Athenian deme

Coordinates: 38°05′44″N 23°54′02″E

Icaria or Ikaria (Ancient Greek: Ἰκαρία), also known as Icarium or Ikarion (Ἰκάριον), was a deme of ancient Attica on the northeastern slopes of Mount Pentelikon. It holds pride of place due to its prominence in Greek mythology as the place where Icarius, or Ikarios (Ικάριος) received the god Dionysus, who taught him the art of making wine. Nearby was Mount Icarius. In historical times, the most famous inhabitant of Ikarion was Thespis, credited with the creation of tragedy according to ancient Greek tradition. A festival of Dionysos which included tragic plays was held here every winter, the Rural Dionysia (Τα Κατ´ Αγρούς η Μικρά Διονυσία). During excavations by the American School of Classical Studies in 1888–89, many inscriptions and sculptures in Pentelic marble were found here which referred to the winners in the dramatic contests of the Rural Dionysia.

The site of Icaria is located near modern Dionysos, Greece.

== Bibliography ==
- Milanezi, Silvia (2007). "Les Icariens et le dème des Icariens (IG II^{2} 1178): à propos de l'identité politique dans un dème attique". In Couvenhes, Jean-Christophe; Milanezi, Silvia (eds.). Individus, groupes et politique à Athènes de Solon à Mithridate. Presses universitaires François-Rabelais. pp. 241–272. ISBN 9782869062269.
