= Aiantis =

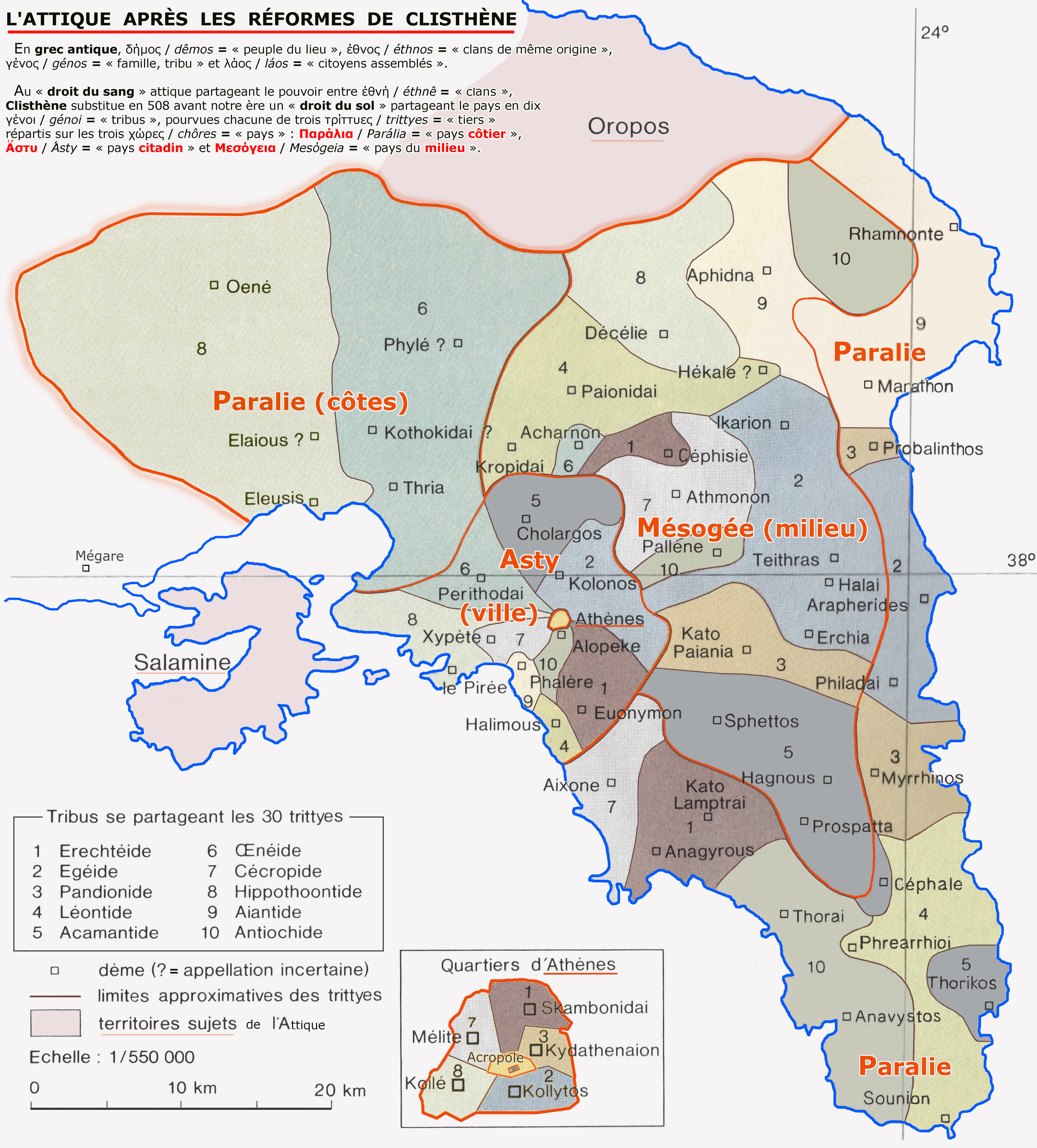
Map of ancient Attica. Trittyes belonging to the phyle of Aiantis are numbered "9" and shaded pale yellow.

Aiantis (Ancient Greek: Αἰαντίς) was a phyle of ancient Attica with six demes: Aphidna, Marathon, Oenoe, Rhamnous, Tricorythus and Phalerum. It was named in honour of Ajax the Great.

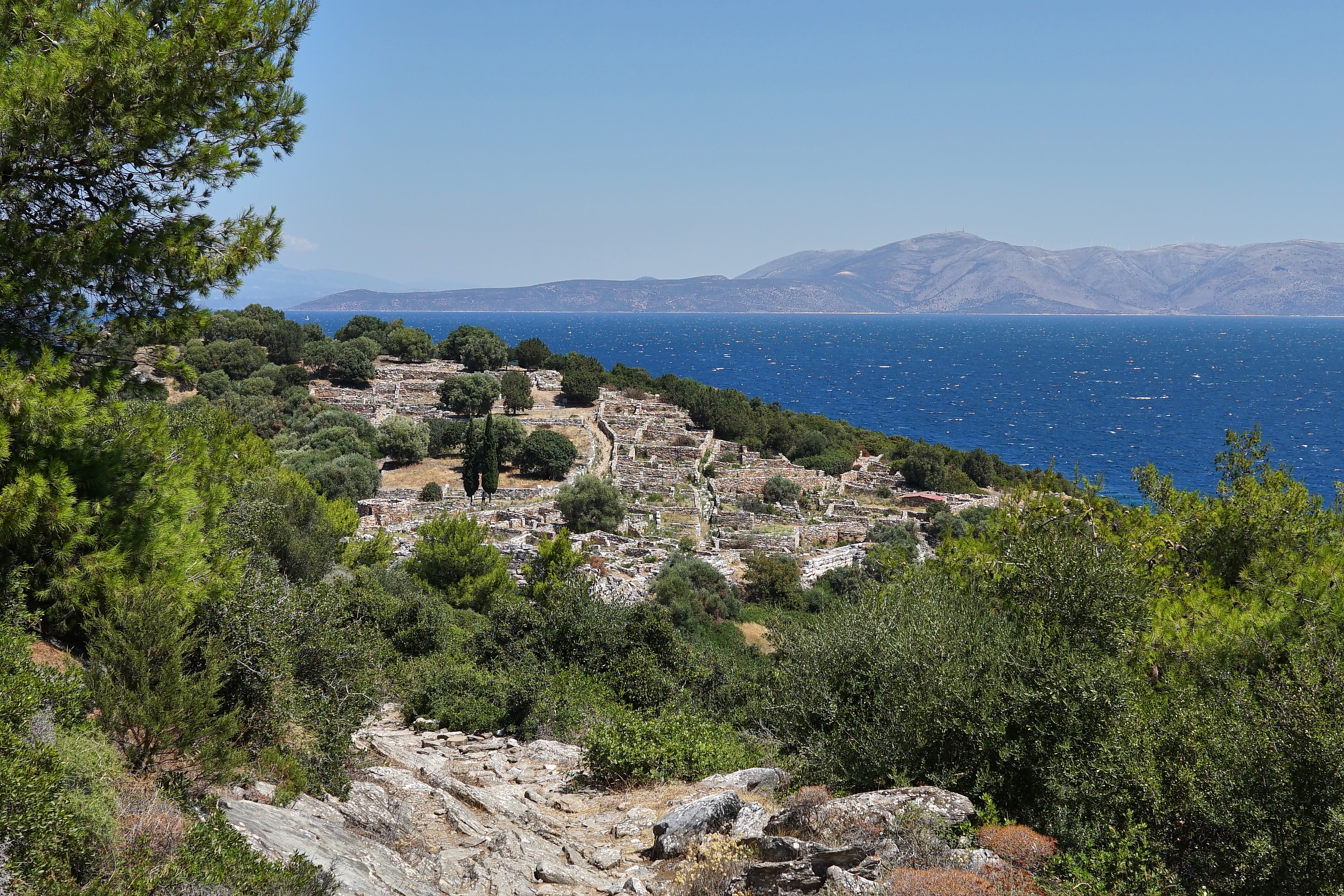
Ruins of Rhamnous, a deme of the Aiantis.

Marathon is located within the boundaries of this place.

It is attested by Plutarch that fifty-two members of the tribe of Aiantis died from wounds sustained in the Battle of Plataea.

The playwright Aeschylus came from deme Eleusis in Aiantis. His family were eupatrids.
