= Potamus Deiradiotes =

Coordinates: 37°47′23″N 24°03′21″E

Potamus Deiradiotes or Potamos Deiradiotes (Ancient Greek: Ποταμός Δειραδιῶτης), was a deme of ancient Attica. It lay on the east coast north of Thoricus, and was once a populous place: it was celebrated as containing the sepulchre of Ion.

Potamus Deiradiotes is tentatively located north of Thorikos.
