= Amphitrope =

Amphitrope (Greek: Ἀμφιτρόπη) was a minor coastal (paralia) deme of ancient Attica, belonging to the Antiochis tribe (phyle), with two representatives in the Boule.

It was situated in the valley of Legrena, between mount Baphi to the west and mount Spitharopussi to the east, close to the modern settlement of Synterina (Συντερίνα, 37.73°N 23.99°E), neighboring the demes of Atene to the west, Sounion to the east and Thorikos to the north-east, on the border between the modern Saronikos and Lavreotiki municipalities.

It was one of the smaller demes of the Mines of Laurion district, with eight or nine mines.

According to Aeschines (Against Timarchus 101), the father of Timarchus had possessions in Amphitrope which he was forced to sell to pay to cover the expenses of the liturgy.

The site of Amphitrope is tentatively located at Pousipelia Megalo Peuka.

== Sources ==
- William Smith (ed.), Dictionary of Greek and Roman Geography (1890) s.v. "Attica" (p. 86).
