= Aigeis =

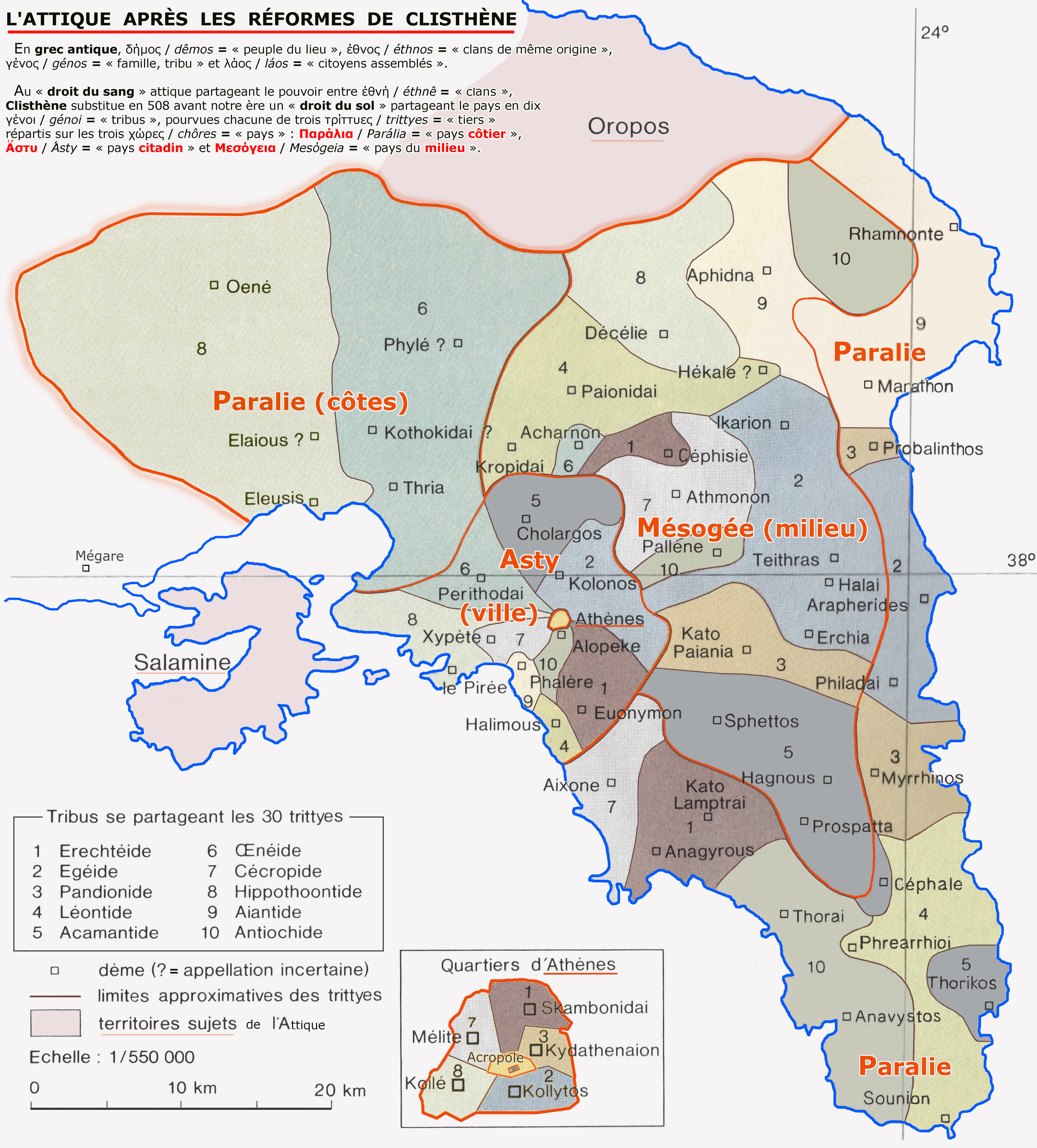
Map of ancient Attica. Trittyes belonging to the phyle of Aigeis are numbered "2" and shaded blue. Unusually, the entire territory of the Aigeis was a single contiguous area.

Aigeis (Ancient Greek: Αἰγηΐς, romanized: Aigēis) was a tribe (phyle) of Ancient Athens which contained twenty demes: Lower and Upper Ankyle, Araphen, Bate, Diomeia, Erchia, Erikeia, Gargettos, Halae Araphenides, Hestiaia, Ikarion, Ionidai, Kollytos, Kolonos, Kydantidai, Myrrhinoutta, Otryne, Phegaia, Philaidai, Plotheia. It was named for the legendary king Aegeus.

The quota of demes for Aigeis showed the greatest variety of all the phyles during the first and second periods (343–253 BC) of bouleutic government.

Of the deme Ankylē, an individual is known, Polystratos, who owned land within that deme.

An individual named Hagnias II had an estate within the deme Araphen.

At the time of the publication of a source published during 1851, the location of Bate was unknown.

Erchia, Ikarion, Phegaia were some of the larger demes of the tribe.
