= Acharnae =

Deme of ancient Athens, Greece

- Ἀχαρναί (Ancient Greek)
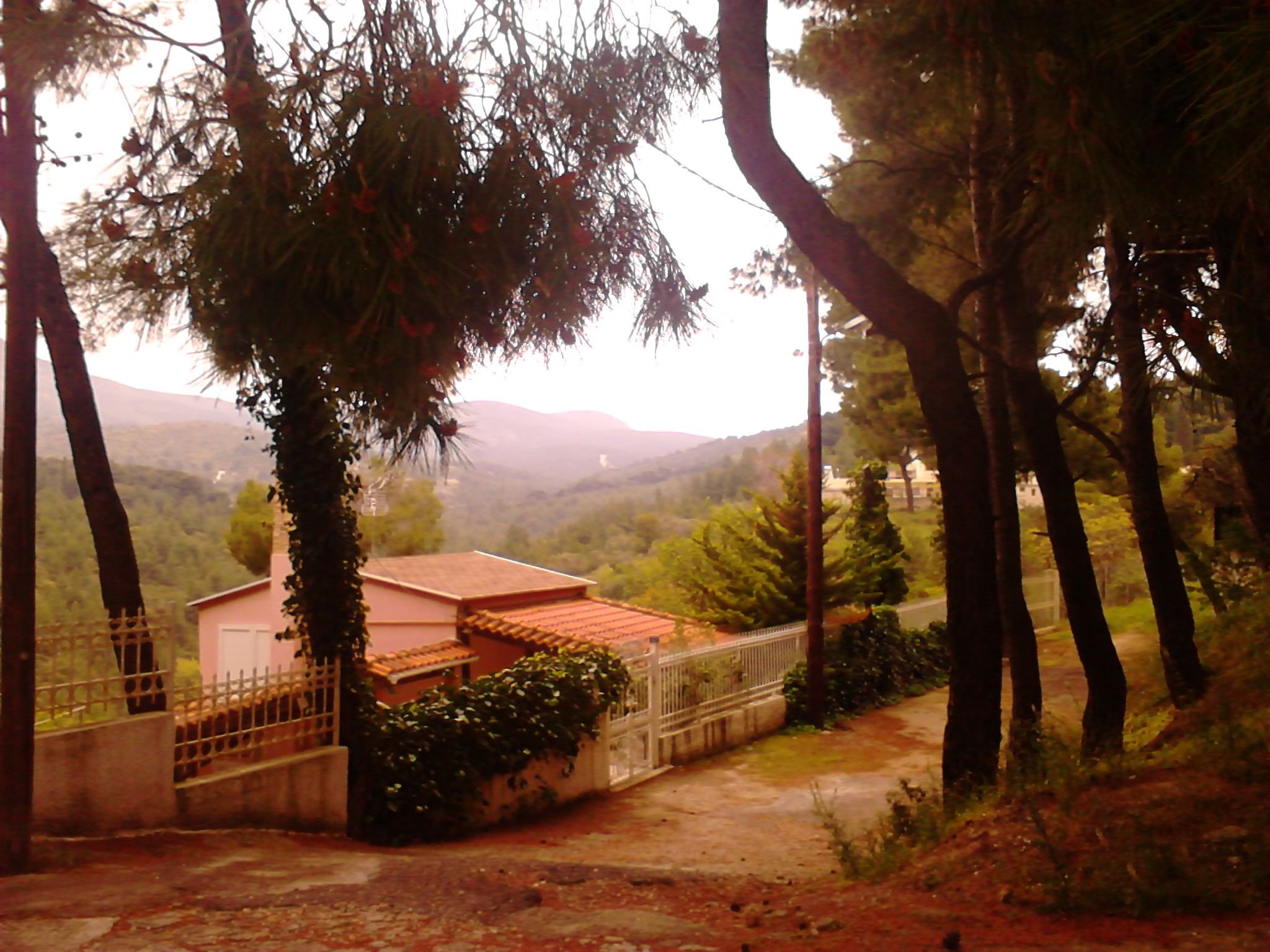
- Acharnian Scenery

- Shown within Attica
- 38°04′55″N 23°43′53″E

Acharnae or Acharnai (/əˈkɑːr.niː/; Ancient Greek: Ἀχαρναί) was a deme of ancient Athens. It was part of the phyle Oineis.

Acharnae, according to Thucydides, was the largest deme in Attica. In the fourth century BCE, 22 of the 500 members of the Athenian council came from Acharnae, more than from any other deme.

== Name ==
The place-name of Acharnae is most likely pre-Greek in origin, similar to other place-names throughout Attica. During antiquity it was believed that the name originated from the word acharna (ἀχάρνα) or acharnos (ἀχαρνός), meaning seabass, due to the shape of the plain that Acharnae was in looking like a fish. Another view was that the name originated from Acharnas, one of the mythical heroes from Attica and the supposed founder of the city.

== Location ==
Acharnae was located in the west-northwest part of the Attic plain, 60 stadia north of Athens, south of Mount Parnes. The site of Acharnae is located at and southwest of Menidi (renamed to modern Acharnes). It was from the woods of this mountain that the Acharnians were enabled to carry on that traffic in charcoal for which they were noted among the Athenians. Their land was fertile; their population was rough and warlike; and they furnished at the commencement of the Peloponnesian War 3,000 hoplites, or a tenth of the whole infantry of the republic. They possessed sanctuaries or altars of Apollo Aguieus, of Heracles, of Athena Hygieia, of Athena Hippia, of Dionysus Melpomenus, and of Dionysus Cissus, so called, because the Acharnians said that the ivy first grew in this deme. One of the plays of Aristophanes bears the name of the Acharnians.

== History ==
The oldest confirmed evidence of permanent inhabitation in the area dates from the Neolithic.

During the Mycenaean period in the Greek Bronze Age the area was continuously inhabited. Near the neighbourhood of Lykopetra a Mycenaean tholos tomb has been discovered, while traces of another Bronze Age tomb have been found in the area today called Nemesis. Many archaeological reports claim several tomb excavations across the entirety of the area, which all point to the possibility of Acharnae possibly being a politically independent region during the period.

The largest amount of archaeological evidence dates from the Classical and Hellenistic periods (5th - 2nd centuries BCE). It consists mostly of graveyards found throughout the entire area, parts of the ancient deme's road network, as well as parts of hydraulic infrastructure from the 4th century BCE. A lot of information is given about the public and private life of the locals during the period by the remnants of the road networks.

In the first phase of the Peloponnesian War the Lacedaemonian (Spartan) army invaded the Athenian home-region of Attica under the command of king Archidamos II, advancing up to Acharnae as the statesman Pericles gathered the citizens of Attica inside the walls of Athens. The Spartan army ravaged the deme and its forestry, setting a series of camps within it, hoping to draw out the Athenians to a pitched battle where the Spartans would have the upper hand. The total destruction of Acharnae and the abandonment of the temple of Ares, a sanctuary of great importance in the deme, led to the warlike depiction of its citizens. Notably, Aristophanes depicted the Acharnians in his work Lysistrata as violent raiders. According to Thucydides the deme offered an army of 3,000 hoplites, 1/10 of the total Athenian army, although this information is believed by historians to be mistaken - there was an analogy of 42 free citizens for every politician of a deme according to the Athenian constitution, thus the number of hoplites Acharnae could offer was only 1,000.

In the aftermath of the Peloponnesian war and during the Athenian civil war, a large battle was commenced in the area between the democratic rebels of Thrasybulus and the forces of the Thirty Tyrants imposed by Sparta. Thrasybulus clashed with all the city's Spartan guard with a force of only 700 men and 2 cavalry divisions attempting to cut off supplies. The battle was victorious for the democrats, who drove away the enemy and slew about 120 of them.

== Economy ==
The Acharnians chiefly grew cereals, grapes, and olives. Acharnae was the centre of the Athenian charcoal-burning industry, and the chorus of Aristophanes' comedy The Acharnians is made up of charcoal-burners. Pindar characterizes them as notably brave. A tholos tomb at Menidi suggests Acharnae was once an independent entity; a temple to Ares was later moved to the Athenian Agora.

Donkeys from Acharnae were noted for their large size, perhaps in humor. Peisander the oligarch (fl. 429-411 BCE), a native of the deme, was nicknamed ὔνος κανθήλιος ("donkey") for at least that reason.

== See also ==
- List of ancient Greek cities
