= Upper Potamus =

Coordinates: 37°57′42″N 23°47′52″E

Upper Potamus, or Potamus Kathyperthen or Potamos Kathyperthen (Ancient Greek: Ποταμός καθύπερθεν), was a deme of ancient Attica. It lay on the east coast north of Thoricus, and was once a populous place: it was celebrated as containing the sepulchre of Ion.

Upper Potamus is tentatively located at Kaisariani monastery.
