= Lower Potamus =

Coordinates: 37°58′19″N 23°47′02″E

Lower Potamus, Potamus Hypenerthen or Potamos Hypenerthen (Ancient Greek: Ποταμός ὑπένερθεν), was a deme of ancient Attica. It lay on the east coast north of Thoricus, and was once a populous place: it was celebrated as containing the sepulchre of Ion.

Lower Potamus is tentatively located at Panepistemioupolis.
