= Sphettus =

Ancient Athenian deme

Coordinates: 37°54′18″N 23°50′02″E

Sphettus or Sphettos (Ancient Greek: Σφηττός) was one of the twelve cities of ancient Attica, and subsequently a deme. That it was situated either in the Mesogaea or the Paralia is certain from the legend, that Pallas, who had obtained these districts, marched upon Athens from Sphettus by the Sphettian Way. There are good reasons for believing that Pallas must have marched round the northern extremity of Hymettus; and consequently the Sphettian road must have taken that course.

The site of Sphettus has been located northwest of Koropi below Christos chapel.

== People ==
- Aeschines of Sphettus
