= Adrianis =

Ancient Athenian phyle

Adrianis (also Hadrianis, Ancient Greek: Ἀδριανίς) was a tribe (phyle) added by the ancient Athenians to the previous list of 12 tribes in 126−127 AD. The tribe was named after the Roman emperor Hadrian. Hadrian first visited Athens in the fall of 125 AD, with the Athenians considering him as their savior. The emperor liked the city and stayed until spring, with his largesse helping to build some of the most interesting buildings of Athens, including the Temple of Olympian Zeus. Athens truly worshipped Hadrian.

Hadrian's statue was added to the Monument of the Eponymous Heroes, starting the so-called Period V.

While Athenians added the new tribe to their list at seventh place, modern researchers use the Roman numeral XV to designate Adrianis.

The 12 out of 13 demes that formed Adrianis were collected from all 12 old phylai ("rule-of-one"), with the 13th, Antinoeis, newly created and named after Antinous, Hadrian's favorite.

== Sources ==
- Bates, F.O. (1898). The Five Post-Kleisthenean Tribes. Cornell studies in classical philology. Vol. VIII. Press of Andrus & Church.
- Camia, Francesco (2022). "Hadrianos Olympios Panhellenios: Worshipping Hadrian in Athens". The Province of Achaea in the 2nd Century CE. Routledge. ISBN 9781003178828.
- Pritchett, Kendrick (1942). "The Tribe Ptolemais". The American Journal of Philology. 63 (4): 413–432. doi:10.2307/291557. JSTOR 291557.
- Traill, John S. (1975). The Political Organization of Attica: A Study of the Demes, Trittyes, and Phylai, and Their Representation in the Athenian Council. Hesperia Supplements. Vol. 14. American School of Classical Studies at Athens. doi:10.2307/1353928. JSTOR 1353928.
