= Agryle =

Agryle (Ancient Greek: Ἀγρυλή, Ἀραυλή, or Ἀγροιλή) was the name of two demoi of ancient Attica, a Lower Agryle (Agryle Hypenerthen) and an Upper Agryle (Agryle Kathyperthen). They lay immediately south of the stadium in the city of Athens.

It is probable that the district of Agrae located south of the Ilisos river, belonged to one of these demoi.
