= Ptolemais (tribe) =

Ptolemais (Ancient Greek: Πτολεμαΐς) was a tribe (phyle) added by the ancient Athenians to the previous list of 12 Athenian tribes. The date of the addition used to be subject of a scholarly discourse, but modern researchers agree with William Scott Ferguson who (in 1932) suggested that the event took place in 224–223 B.C. Ptolemy III was chosen as one of the Eponymous Heroes due to urgency of keeping friendship with Ptolemaic Egypt. The Monument of the Eponymous Heroes had one statue added, starting the so-called Period III.

While the Athenians added the new phyle to their list at the 7th place, modern researchers use the Roman numeral XIII to designate Ptolemais.

The 13 demes that formed Ptolemais were collected from all 12 old phylai ("rule-of-one"), with the 13th, Berenicidae, newly created and named after Berenice II, wife of Ptolemy III. There was a scientific discourse on the subject, with Pritchett (1942) arguing that the "Macedonian" tribes Antigonis and Demetrias were spared.

== Sources ==
- Bates, F.O. (1898). The Five Post-Kleisthenean Tribes. Cornell studies in classical philology. Vol. VIII. Press of Andrus & Church.
- Pritchett, Kendrick (1942). "The Tribe Ptolemais". The American Journal of Philology. 63 (4): 413–432. doi:10.2307/291557. JSTOR 291557.
- Russo, Daria (2023). "Lead Tokens and Athenian Tribes: Iconography and Contexts of Use". In Gkikaki, M.E. (ed.). Tokens in Classical Athens and Beyond (PDF). Liverpool University Press. pp. 83–110. ISBN 978-1-83764-389-9.
- Traill, John S. (1975). The Political Organization of Attica: A Study of the Demes, Trittyes, and Phylai, and Their Representation in the Athenian Council. Hesperia Supplements. Vol. 14. doi:10.2307/1353928. JSTOR 1353928.
