= Thorae =

Ancient Attican deme

Coordinates: 37°47′36″N 23°56′15″E

Thorae or Thorai (Ancient Greek: Θοραί) was a deme of ancient Attica, located a little south of Anagyrus.

The site of Thorae is tentatively located at Agios Demetrios Trapuria.
