= Antigonis and Demetrias =

Antigonis and Demetrias (Ancient Greek: Ἀντιγονίς, Δημητριάς) were two tribes (phylai) added by the ancient Athenians, in this order, to the previous list of 10 Athenian tribes in the year 307–306 B.C., sometime after the fifth prytany. The names of the tribes were chosen to honor Macedonian king Demetrios Poliorketes and his father, Antigonos I Monophthalmos, by adding them to the list of Eponymous Heroes of Athens, effectively making them into gods. This change followed Demetrios expelling Kassandros from Athens and the end of the semi-oligarchic rule of Demetrios of Phaleron in 307 B.C. In 200 B.C., when Athens was involved in the Second Macedonian War against Macedon, the Antigonis and Demetrias phylai were disbanded, and public inscriptions about them erased.

While Athenians added the new phylai to the top of their list, modern researchers use Roman numerals XI and XII to designate Antigonis and Demetrias respectively.

== Changes to the Athenian governance ==
The creation of new tribes is described by Plutarch in his Life of Demetrius and included change of "the number of the senators [councilors of the Athenian boule], which had been five hundred, to six hundred, since each of the tribes must furnish fifty senators". While Demetrios fashioned his reforms as a return to the "ancient form of government", in fact it was a major revision of the two-hundred-years-old Kleisthenic order.

The number of demes was kept the same, so almost all old phylai lost 3 to 5 demes to provide fifteen demes for each of the new tribes (only the small Aiantis phyle was spared). The legislative calendar was changed from ten prytanies to twelve, 40 days of the ekklesia duration were now divided into shorter segments, and the number of magistrates and members of the courts of law were proportionally increased. Traill (1975) suggests the use of "rule-of-three": phylai that gave up demes lost three of them each, with the largest ones making up for the omission of Aiantis by giving four (Aigeis) and five (Leontis).

Athenians became dissatisfied with Demetrios and revolted in 287 BC, stripping him of all the divine honors − but kept the new system functioning until 200 BC. This suggests that the additional phylai were not motivated just by the desire to flatter the liberators, and were popular on their own.

== Changes to the Monument of the Eponymous Heroes ==
The late 4th century BC saw two statues added to the Monument of the Eponymous Heroes, representing Antigonos and Demetrios, starting the so-called Period II of the monument). The Period II addition was reversed after a century, when Philip V of Macedon besieged Athens during the Second Macedonian War, followed by adding a sculpture of Attalos I (Period IV, the Period III in between was marked by a statue of Ptolemy III, adding the phyle Ptolemais).

== Sources ==
- Bates, F.O. (1898). The Five Post-Kleisthenean Tribes. Cornell studies in classical philology. Vol. VIII. Press of Andrus & Church.
- Kirchner, Joh. E. (1892). "Die Zusammensetzung der Phylen Antigonis und Demetrias". Rheinisches Museum für Philologie (in German). 47. J.D. Sauerländers Verlag: 550–557. ISSN 0035-449X. JSTOR 41248334.
- Kruse, Thomas (2021). Harter-Uibopuu, K.; Riess, W. (eds.). Not just a Return to the patrios politeia. Or how to turn ten into twelve: Response to Ilias Arnaoutoglou. Symposion 2019. Vorträge zur griechischen und hellenistischen Rechtsgeschichte (Hamburg, 26.–28. August 2019). Wien: Akten der Gesellschaft für Griechische und Hellenistische Rechtsgeschichte, Band 28. pp. 283–288.
- Mattusch, C.C. (1996). Classical Bronzes: The Art and Craft of Greek and Roman Statuary. Cornell University Press. ISBN 978-0-8014-3182-1.
- Pritchett, W. Kendrick (1940). "The Composition of the Tribes Antigonis and Demetrias". The American Journal of Philology. 61 (2): 186–193. doi:10.2307/290734. JSTOR 290734.
- Traill, John S. (1975). The Political Organization of Attica: A Study of the Demes, Trittyes, and Phylai, and Their Representation in the Athenian Council. Hesperia Supplements. Vol. 14. American School of Classical Studies at Athens. doi:10.2307/1353928. JSTOR 1353928.
