= Greece in the 5th century BC =

Period in Greek politics and culture covering the 5th century BC

The period of the 5th century BC in classical Greece is generally considered as beginning in 500 BC and ending in 404 BC, though this is debated. This century is essentially studied from the Athenian viewpoint, since Athens has left more narratives, plays and other written works than the other Greek states. If one looks at Athens, our principal source, one might consider that this century begins in 510 BC, with the fall of the Athenian tyrant and Cleisthenes's reforms. If one looks at the whole Greek world, however, we might place its beginning at the Ionian Revolt in 500 BC, that provoked the first Persian invasion of 492 BC. The Persians (called "Medes") were finally defeated in 490 BC. A second Persian attempt failed in 480–479 BC. The Delian League then formed, under Athenian hegemony and as Athens' instrument. Athens' excesses caused several revolts among the allied cities, which were all put down by force, but Athenian dynamism finally awoke Sparta and brought about the Peloponnesian War in 431 BC. After both sides were exhausted, a brief peace occurred, and then the war resumed to Sparta's advantage. Athens was definitively defeated in 404 BC, and some internal Athenian agitations ended the 5th century in Greece.

== Cleisthenes ==
In 510 BC, Spartan troops helped the Athenians overthrow their king, a tyrant Hippias, son of Peisistratos. Cleomenes I, the king of Sparta, installed a pro-Spartan oligarchy led by Isagoras by claiming that his rival Cleisthenes was to be expelled from the city due to the old Cylonian curse. Cleisthenes, however, was assisted by the support of the middle class and democrats, reversed this. Cleomenes intervened in 508 BC and 506 BC, but could not stop Cleisthenes, now supported by the Athenians. By his reforms, Cleisthenes endowed the city with isonomic institutions (that is, institutions in which all have the same rights) and established ostracism.

The isonomic and isegoric (iségoria: same legal right) democracy expressed itself first in the deme. Citizenship required enrolling on the citizenship list of a deme, of which there were about 130 in Attica. The 10,000 citizens of the demes exercised their power via the assembly (the ecclesia, in Greek) of which they all were part, headed by a council of 500 citizens chosen at random.

The city's administrative geography was overhauled, the goal being to have mixed political groups, classified by local interests linked to the sea, to the city, or to farming, and to which decisions (such as declarations of war) would be submitted to their geographical position. The territory of the city was divided into 30 trittyes as follows:

- ten trittyes in the coastal Paralia
- ten trittyes in the Asty, the urban centre
- ten trittyes in the rural Mesogeia.

A tribe was three trittyes, taken at random, one of each from these three. Each tribe therefore always acted in the interests of all three areas. All of the trittyes of a tribe met at a point or a line or were geographically separate.

These reforms eventually allowed the emergence of a wider democracy in the 460s and 450s BC.

== The Persian Wars ==
In Ionia (the modern Aegean coast of Turkey) the Greek cities, which included great centres such as Miletus and Halicarnassus, were unable to maintain their independence and came under the rule of the Persian Empire in the mid-6th century BC. In 499 BC the Greeks rose against the Persians in the Ionian Revolt, and Athens and some other Greek cities went to their aid, though they were at forced to back down following their defeat in 494 BC at the Battle of Lade. The Greek cities in Asia Minor returned to Persian control.

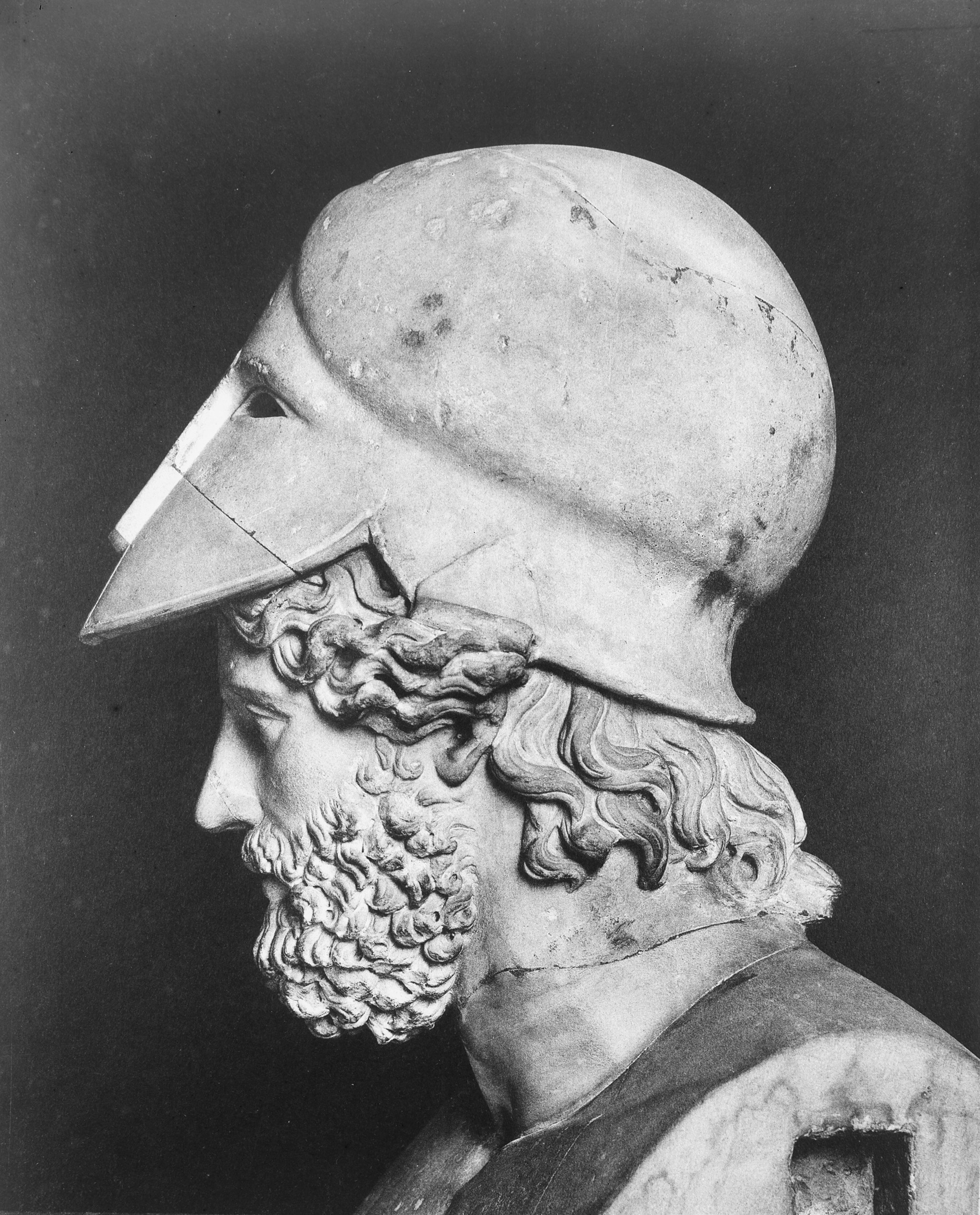
Ancient Greek bust of Themistocles

In 492 BC, the Persian generals Mardonios and Datis launched a naval assault on the Aegean islands, causing them to submit, then unsuccessfully attempted to disembark at Marathon in 490 BC to take Athens. In 490 BC, the Persian Great King, Darius I, having suppressed the Ionian cities, sent a fleet to punish the Greeks. Hundred thousand Persians landed in Attica, attempting to take Athens, but were defeated at the Battle of Marathon by a Greek army of 9000 Athenian hoplites and 1000 Plateans led by the Athenian general Miltiades. The Persian fleet continued to Athens but, seeing it garrisoned, decided not to attempt an assault.

During the subsequent period of peace, in 483 BC, a silver-bearing seam had been discovered in the Laurion (a small mountain range close to Athens), and the hundreds of talents mined there had paid for the construction of 200 warships to fight Aegina's piracy.

In 480 BC, Darius' successor Xerxes I sent a much more powerful force of 300,000 by land, with over 1200 ships in support, across a double boat-bridge over the Hellespont. This army took Thrace, before descending on Thessaly and Boetia, whilst the Persian navy skirted the coast and resupplied the ground troops. The Greek fleet, meanwhile, dashed to block the Persians at Cape Artemision. After being delayed by the Spartan King Leonidas I at Thermopylae, Xerxes advanced into Attica, where he captured and burned Athens. But the Athenians had evacuated the city by sea, and under Themistocles they defeated the Persian fleet at the Battle of Salamis.

In 479 BC, the Greeks, under the Spartan Pausanias, defeated the Persian army at Plataea. The Athenian fleet then turned to chasing the Persians out of the Aegean Sea, defeating their fleet decisively in the Battle of Mycale, and in 478 BC the Athenian fleet captured Byzantium. In the course of doing so Athens enrolled all the island states and some mainland allies into an alliance, called the Delian League because the League's treasury was kept on the sacred island of Delos. The Spartans, although they had taken part in the war, withdrew from any further involvement, allowing Athens to become the unchallenged naval and commercial power in the region.

== The Delian League and Athenian dominance ==
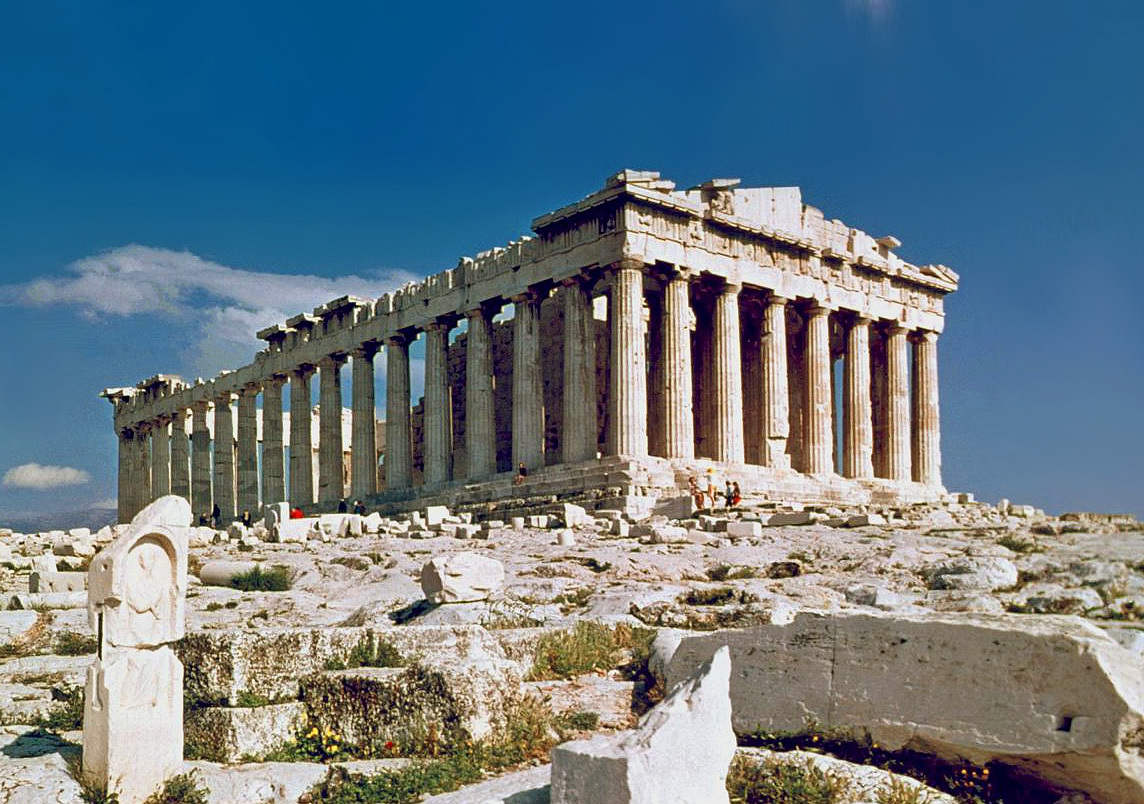
The western side of the Parthenon on the Acropolis of Athens.

The end of the attempted Persian invasion of Greece ushered in a century of Athenian dominance of Greek affairs. Athens was the unchallenged master of the sea, and also the leading commercial power, although Corinth remained a serious rival. The leading statesman of this time was Pericles, who used the tribute paid by the members of the Delian League to build the Parthenon and other great monuments of classical Athens. By the mid-5th century BC, the League had become an Athenian Empire, symbolized by the transfer of the League's treasury from Delos to the Parthenon in 454 BC.

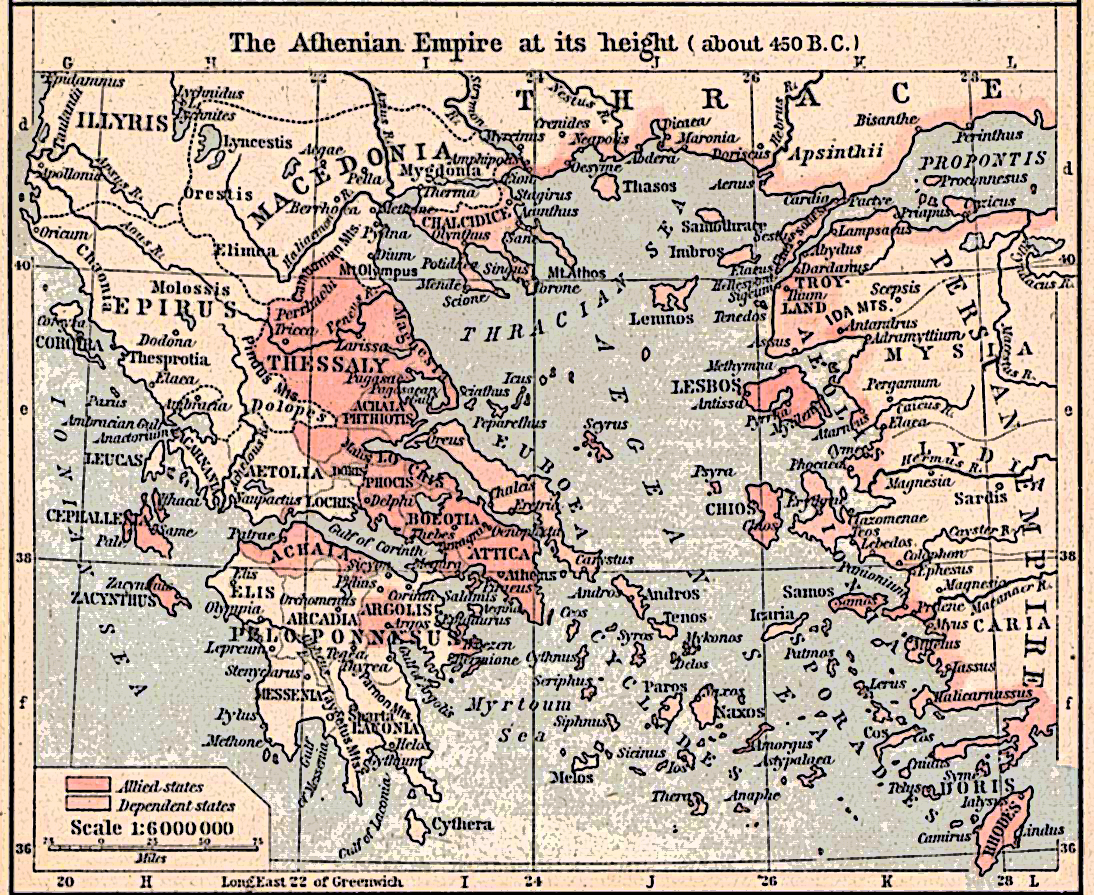
Map of the Athenian empire c. 450 BC

The wealth of Athens attracted talented people from all over Greece, and also created a wealthy leisure class who became patrons of the arts. The Athenian state also sponsored learning and the arts, particularly architecture. Athens became the centre of Greek literature, philosophy (see Greek philosophy) and the arts (see Greek theatre). Some of the greatest figures of Western cultural and intellectual history lived in Athens during this period: the dramatists Aeschylus, Aristophanes, Euripides, and Sophocles, the philosophers Aristotle, Plato, and Socrates, the historians Herodotus, Thucydides, and Xenophon, the poet Simonides and the sculptor Phidias. The city became, in Pericles's words, "the school of Hellas".

The other Greek city-states at first accepted Athenian leadership in the continuing war against the Persians, but after the fall of the conservative politician Cimon in 461 BC, Athens became an increasingly open imperialist power. After the Greek victory at the Battle of the Eurymedon in 466 BC, the Persians were no longer a threat, and some states, such as Naxos, tried to secede from the League, but were forced to submit. The Athenian leaders let relations between Athens and Sparta deteriorate, and in 458 BC war broke out. After some years of inconclusive war a 30-year peace was signed between the Delian League and the Peloponnesian League (Sparta and her allies). This coincided with the last battle between the Greeks and the Persians, a sea battle off Salamis in Cyprus, followed by the Peace of Callias (450 BC) between the Greeks and Persians.

== The Peloponnesian War ==
In 431 BC, war broke out again between Athens and Sparta and their allies. The immediate causes of the Peloponnesian War vary among the ancient historians. However, three causes are proposed by both Thucydides and Plutarch. Prior to the war, Corinth and one of its colonies, Corcyra (modern-day Corfu), became involved in a dispute in which Athens intervened. Soon after, Corinth and Athens argued over control of Potidaea (near modern-day Nea Potidaia), eventually leading to an Athenian siege of the city. Finally, Athens issued a series of economic decrees known as the Megarian Decrees that placed economic sanctions on the Megarian people. Athens was accused by the Peloponnesian allies of violating the Thirty Years Peace through each of these actions, and Sparta formally declared war on Athens.

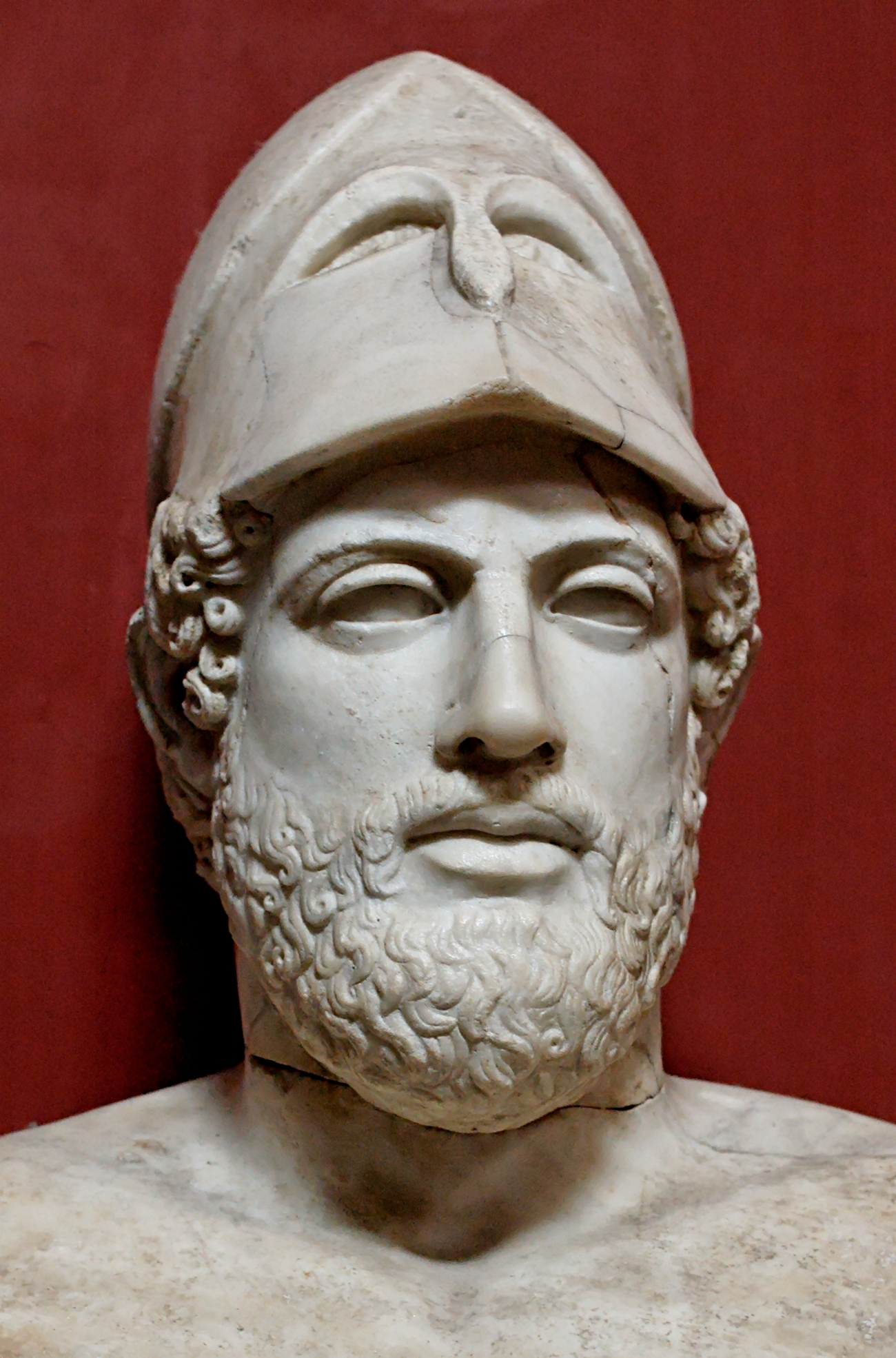
Bust of Pericles, marble Roman copy after a Greek original from c. 430 BC

Many historians consider these actions to be only a partial explanation for the start of Peloponnesian War between Sparta and Athens. They argue that the underlying cause was the growing resentment of Sparta and its allies at the dominance of Athens over Greek affairs. The war lasted 27 years, partly because Athens (a naval power) and Sparta (a land-based military power) found it difficult to come to grips with each other.

Sparta's initial strategy was to invade Attica, but the Athenians were able to retreat behind their walls. An outbreak of plague in the city during the siege caused heavy losses, including the death of Pericles. At the same time the Athenian fleet landed troops in the Peloponnese, winning battles at Naupactus (429 BC) and Pylos (425 BC). But these tactics were not able to provide either side with a decisive victory. After several years of inconclusive campaigning, the moderate Athenian leader Nicias concluded the Peace of Nicias (421 BC).

In 418 BC, however, hostility between Sparta and the Athenian ally Argos led to a resumption of fighting. At Mantinea Sparta defeated the combined armies of Athens and her allies. The resumption of fighting brought the war party, led by Alcibiades, back to power in Athens. In 415 BC Alcibiades persuaded the Athenian Assembly to launch a major expedition against Syracuse, a Peloponnesian ally in Sicily. Though Nicias was a sceptic about the Sicilian Expedition, he was appointed along with Alcibiades to lead the expedition. After the affair of the sacrilege of Hermes, Alcibiades defected back to Sparta, leaving the expedition he had initiated in the hands of a reluctant Nicias. Alcibiades persuaded Sparta to send aid to Syracuse. As a result, the 413 BC Athenian expedition was a complete disaster and the whole expeditionary force was lost. Nicias was executed by his captors.

By this time, Sparta had built a fleet (with the help of the Persians) to challenge Athenian naval supremacy, and had found a brilliant military leader in Lysander, who seized the strategic initiative by occupying the Hellespont, the source of Athens' grain imports. Threatened with starvation, Athens sent its last remaining fleet to confront Lysander, who decisively defeated them at Aegospotami (405 BC). The loss of her fleet threatened Athens with bankruptcy. In 404 BC Athens sued for peace, and Sparta dictated a predictably stern settlement: Athens lost her city walls, her fleet, and all of her overseas possessions. Lysander abolished the Athenian democracy and appointed a council of thirty to govern Athens in its place.

== See also ==
- Fifth-century Athens
- Classical Greece
- Classical Antiquity
- Ancient Greek art
