= Hippothontis =

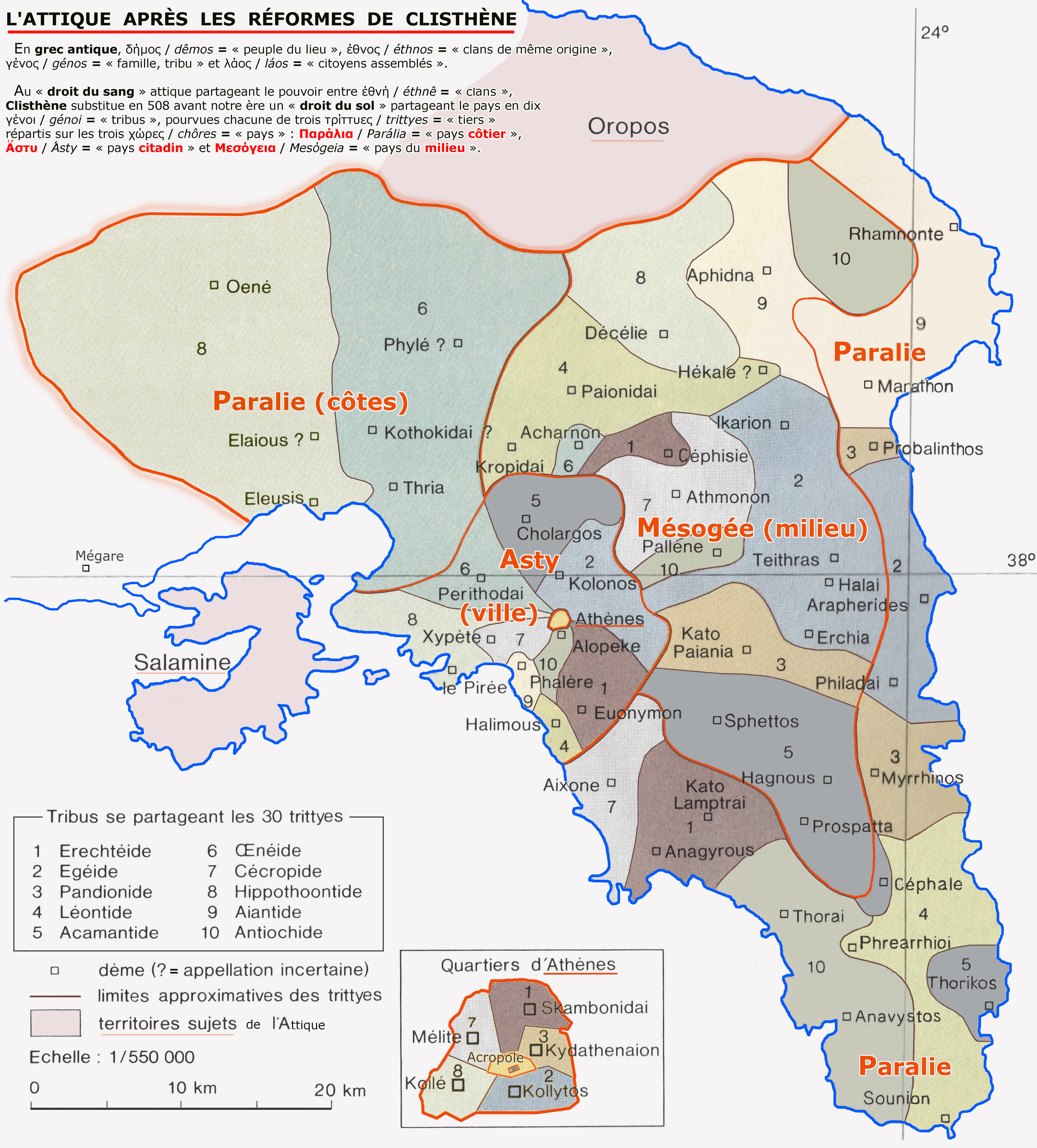
Map of ancient Attica. Trittyes belonging to the phyle of Hippothontis are numbered "8" and shaded pale green.

Hippothontis (Greek: Ιπποθοντίς) was one of the phylai (tribes) of classical Athens, created during the reforms of Cleisthenes.

It was named after the legendary hero Hippothoon.

Its demes were Azenia, Hamaxanteia, Anakaia, Auridai, Acherdous, Dekeleia, Elaious, Eleusis, Eroeadae, Thymaitadai, Keiriadai, Koile, Kopros, Korydallos, Oinoe, (of the west) Oion Dekeleikon, Peiraieus.
