= Acamantis =

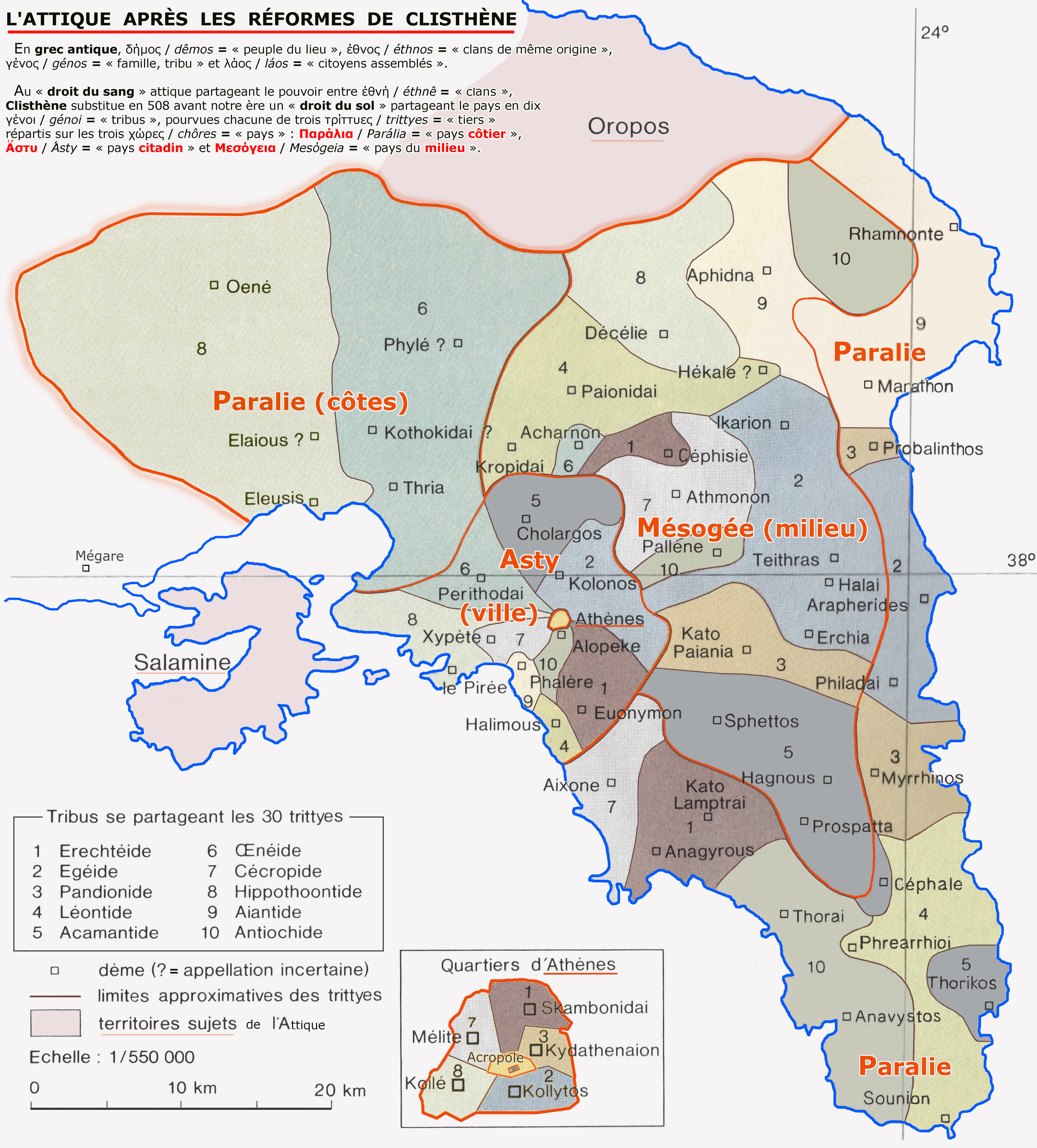
Map of ancient Attica. Trittyes belonging to the phyle of Acamantis are numbered "5" and shaded dark grey.

Acamantis (Greek: Ἀκαμαντίς, romanized: Akamantis) was one of the phylai (tribes) of classical Athens, created during the reforms of Cleisthenes. It was named after the legendary hero Acamas, and included the demes of Cholargos, Eiresidai, Hermos, Iphistiadai, Kerameis, Kephale, Poros, Thorikos, Eitea, Hagnous, Kikynna, Prospalta and Sphettos.

Pericles was a member of this tribe.
