= Asty =

Ancient Greek word for the physical space of a city or town

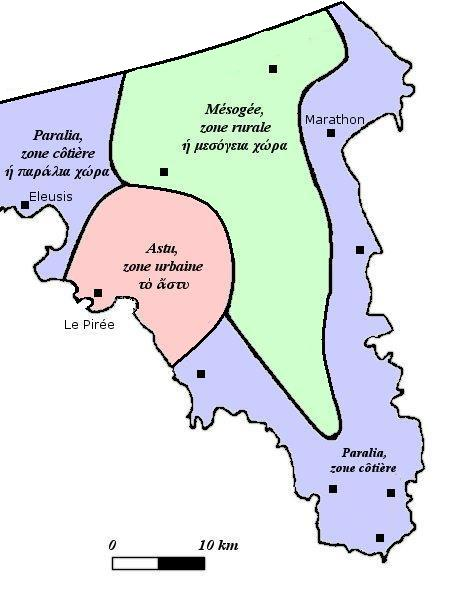
The division of Attica into urban (pink), inland (green), and coastal (blue) zones by Cleisthenes

Asty (Greek: ἄστυ; Ancient Greek: [ásty]) was the physical space of a city or town in Ancient Greece, especially as opposed to the political concept of a polis, which encompassed the entire territory and citizen body of a city-state.

In Classical Athens, the asty was specifically the urban demoi of Attica, as opposed to the inland (mesogeia) and coastal (paralia) demoi that comprised each of the ten Attic tribes. Despite their name, most of the demoi of the asty were rural in character. Comprising about 42 of the 139 demoi of the Athenian state, they provided about 130 bouleutai in the 500-strong boule. However, due to their proximity to the city of Athens, they were over-represented in the institutions of the Athenian democracy; in surviving records, the names of the bouleutai from the asty are mentioned 1.5 to 2 times as often as those from the rest of Attica.

== Asty Demoi ==
Asty demoi located within Athens inside the Themistoclean Wall:

- Coele
- Collytus
- Cydathenaeum
- Melite
- Scambonidae

Asty demoi located within Athens outside the Themistoclean Wall:

- Ankyle (Upper & Lower)
- Agryle (Upper & Lower)
- Alopece
- Butadae
- Cerameis
- Ceriadae
- Daedalidae
- Diomea
- Laciadae
- Piraeus
- Xypete

Asty demoi located outside Athens:

- Cholargos
- Colonae
- Ikarion
- Probalinthos
- Rhamnous
- Semachidae

Unlocated asty demoi:

- Cholleidai
- Eitea
- Hippotomadai
- Otryne
