= Perrhidae =

Deme of ancient Attica

Perrhidae or Perrhidai (Ancient Greek: Περρίδαι) was a deme of ancient Attica, probably in the neighbourhood of Aphidna. Perrhidae, together with Aphidna, Titacidae, and Thyrgonidae, are said to have been removed from the phyle of Aeantis to another tribe. Perrhidae is described as a deme in Aphidna.

Its site is unlocated.
