= Cicynna =

Coordinates: 37°56′18″N 23°50′22″E

Cicynna or Kikynna (Ancient Greek: Κίκυννα) was a deme of ancient Attica of the phyle of Acamantis, sending two or three delegates to the Athenian Boule.

It was the native deme of Strepsiades, the protagonist in Aristophanes' The Clouds. Representing the generality of the deme, Aristophanes depicts this character as a prosperous farmer and attentive to his lazy son. Probably Cicynna had his own diasia, the most important festival to Zeus in Attica, in which the god was honored as Zeus Meilichius: this is evident from a passage from the aforementioned comedy by Aristophanes. The party was held on the 23rd of Anthesterion (around the beginning of March); the richest people offered sacrifices, and the poorest burned incense.

Its site is tentatively located near modern Chalidou.
