= Keratea =

Keratea Κερατέα
- Municipal unit
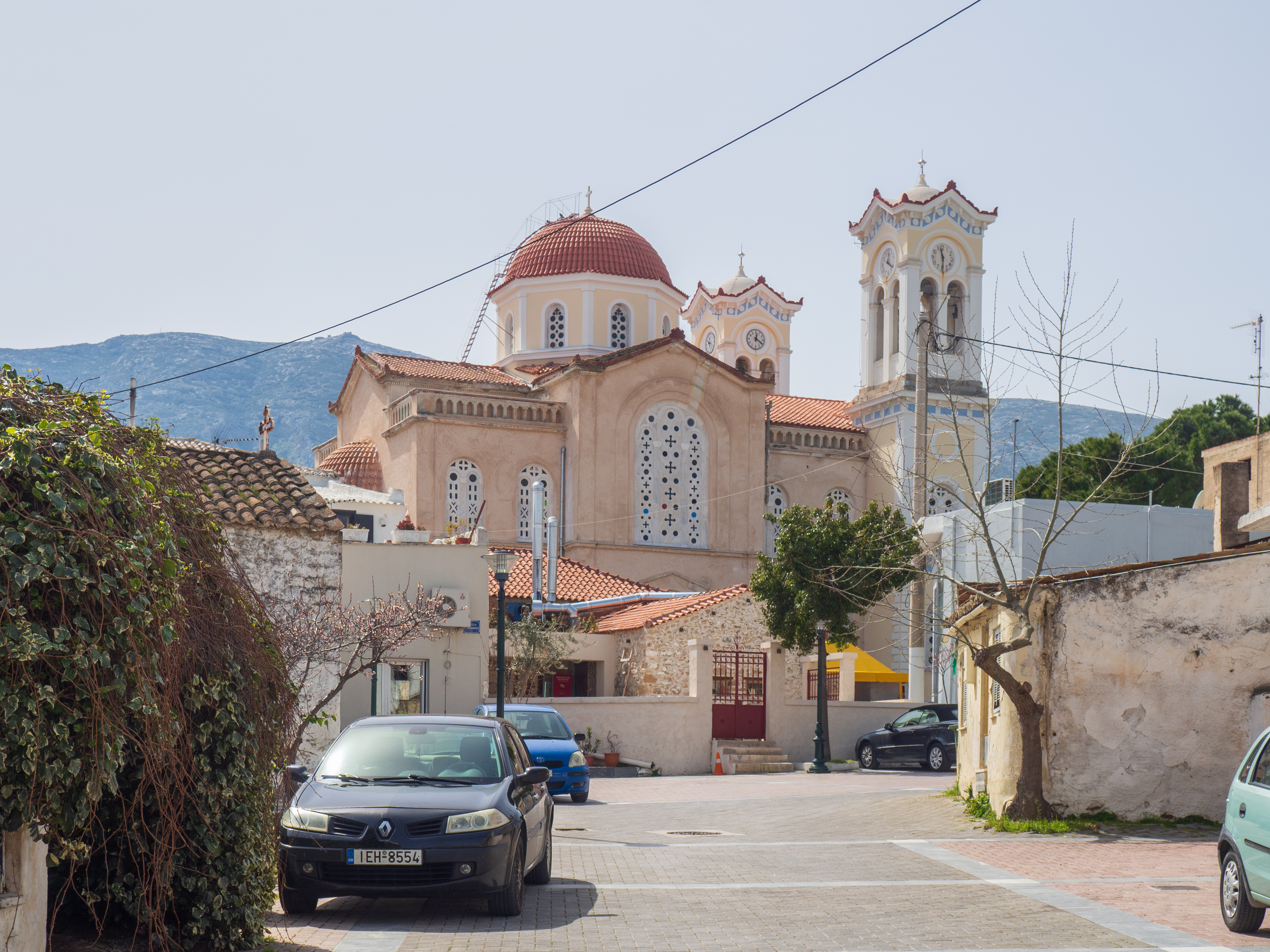
- A street and the Cathedral of Saint Demetrius

- Location within the regional unit

- Location within Greece
- Coordinates: 37°48′N 23°58′E
- Country: Greece
- Administrative region: Attica
- Regional unit: East Attica
- Municipality: Lavreotiki

Area
  - Municipal unit: 129.864 km^{2} (50.141 sq mi)
- Elevation: 158 m (518 ft)

Population (2021)
  - Municipal unit: 14,483
  - Municipal unit density: 111.52/km^{2} (288.85/sq mi)
- Time zone: UTC+2 (EET)
  - Summer (DST): UTC+3 (EEST)
- Postal code: 190 01
- Area code: 22990
- Vehicle registration: Z
- Website: www.keratea.gr

Keratea (Greek: Κερατέα) is a town in East Attica, Greece. Since the 2011 local government reform it is part of the municipality Lavreotiki, of which it is a municipal unit. The municipal unit has an area of 129.864 km^{2}. It is part of Athens metropolitan area.

== Geography ==
Keratea is situated in the hills in the southeastern part of the Attica peninsula, 6 km west of the Aegean Sea coast, at about 200 m elevation. It lies at the northern foot of Mount Paneion. It is 5 km southeast of Kalyvia Thorikou, 12 km northwest of Lavrio and 29 km southeast of Athens city centre. Greek National Road 89 (Gerakas - Koropi - Lavrio - Sounio) passes through Keratea.

In antiquity, the area of present Keratea was part of the deme Cephale, of the phyle Acamantis in Mesogeia area of Ancient Athens.

The municipal unit Keratea consists of the town Keratea proper and 62 other settlements, including Kaki Thalassa and Pefka.

== Historical population ==
Year	Town population	Municipality population
1981	7,511	—
1991	6,512	9,715
2001	7,472	11,205
2011	7,493	14,763
2021	8,340	14,483

The town has historically been an Arvanite settlement.

== Historical monuments ==
The church of St. Athanasius (Kronizes). A wall painting monument (1744) of George Markou the Argus, the great and prolific post-Byzantine ecclesiastic iconographer of the 18th century (".... Il Santo Athanasio, che si trova alla Regione Cronizes di Kerateas dell 'Attica...." Evangelos Andreou http://ketlib.lib.unipi.gr/xmlui/handle/ket/849 )

== Sports ==
Keratea hosts the football team A.C. Keratea, one of the most successful East Attica football clubs, and the multi-sport G.S. Kerateas (Gymnastikos Syllogos Kerateas), the women's volleyball team has represent the town in Greek A1 Division for several years.

== 2011 riots ==
In 2011, during the Greek anti-austerity movement, the residents of Keratea fought Greek law enforcement over plans for a landfill to be created on a nearby hillside. The movement began in December 2010, with the worst of the clashes occurring between March and April of 2011. Residents attacked police with Molotov Cocktails, torched construction vehicles and erected trenches and a barricade across the highway. The rioting ended in May when Papandreou withdrew law enforcement and shelved the landfill initiative.

== See also ==
- List of municipalities of Attica
