= Anacaea =

Coordinates: 38°08′28″N 23°53′21″E

Anacaea or Anakaia (Ancient Greek: Ἀνακαία) was a deme of ancient Attica, of the phyle of Hippothontis, sending three delegates to the Athenian Boule.

Its site is tentatively located near modern Mygdaleza.
