= Acherdus =

Acherdus or Acherdous (Ancient Greek: Ἀχερδοῦς) was a deme of ancient Attica, of the phyle of Hippothontis, sending one delegate to the Boule.

Its site is unlocated, but in the Thriasian Plain.
