= Lower Ancyle =

Coordinates: 37°58′36″N 23°45′21″E

Lower Ancyle or Ankyle Hypenerthen (Ancient Greek: Ἀγκυλή ὑπένερθεν) was the name of a deme of ancient Attica. It was located east of Athens and bordering Agryle to the south. Upper Ancyle passed from the phyle Aigeis to Antigonis in 307/306 BCE; Lower Ancyle remained in the Aigeis phyle.

In the 3rd century, in Roman times, the demoi were home to rich landed properties. Their name derives from the Greek name for "javelin" (which was thrown with a rope). The same root also appears in an epithet attributed to Cronus and to Prometheus, "of sharp wits".

The site of Lower Ancyle is located northeast of modern Ardettos.
