= Hamaxantia =

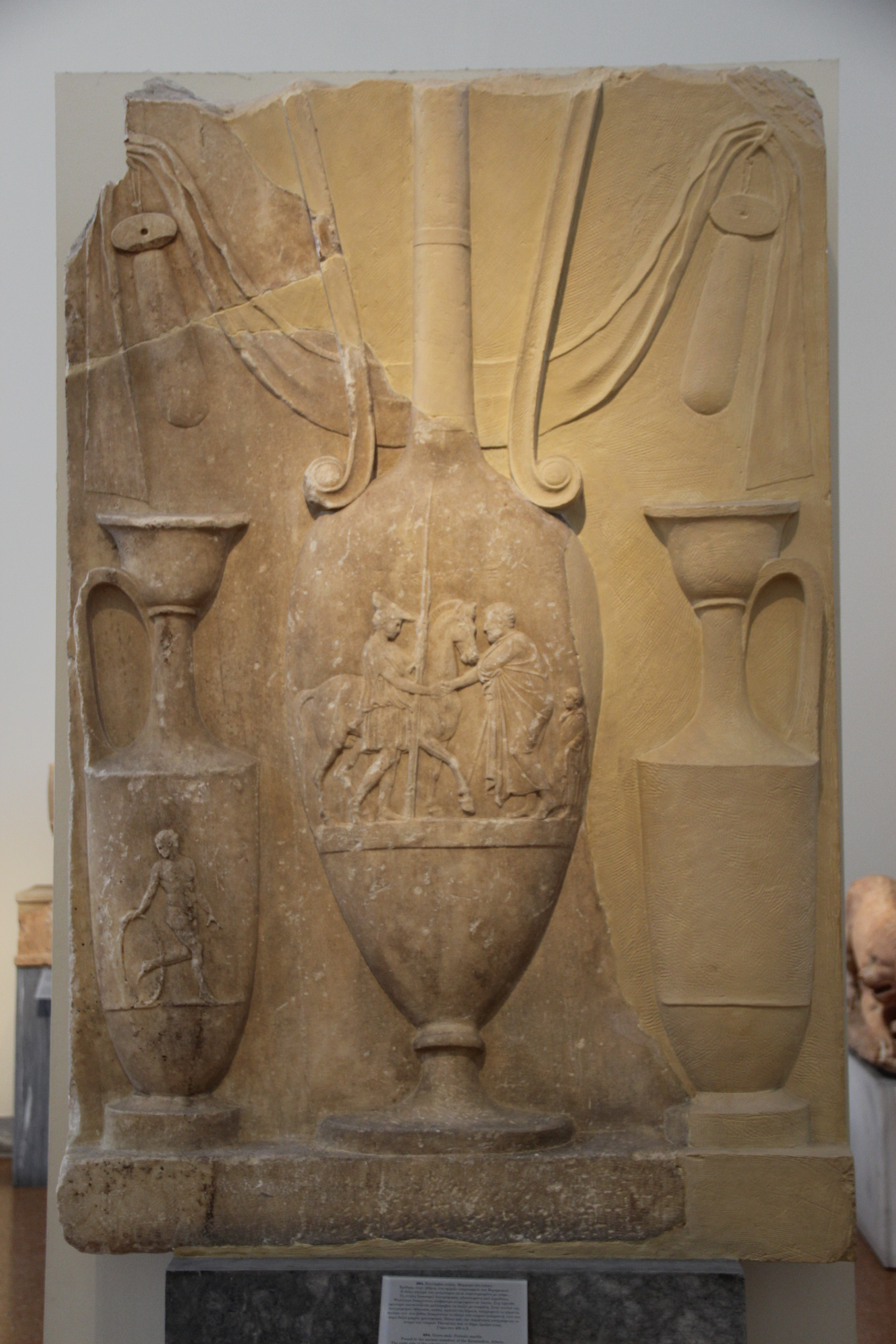
Stele for Panaitios of Hamaxanteia (NAMA 884)

Hamaxantia or Hamaxanteia (Ancient Greek: Ἁμαξάντεια) was a deme of ancient Attica, of the phyle of Hippothontis, sending one delegate to the Boule.

Its site is unlocated.

== Known residents ==
- Panaitios C. 400 BC (grave stele)
