= Kaki Thalassa =

Kaki Thalassa Κακή Θάλασσα
- Settlement
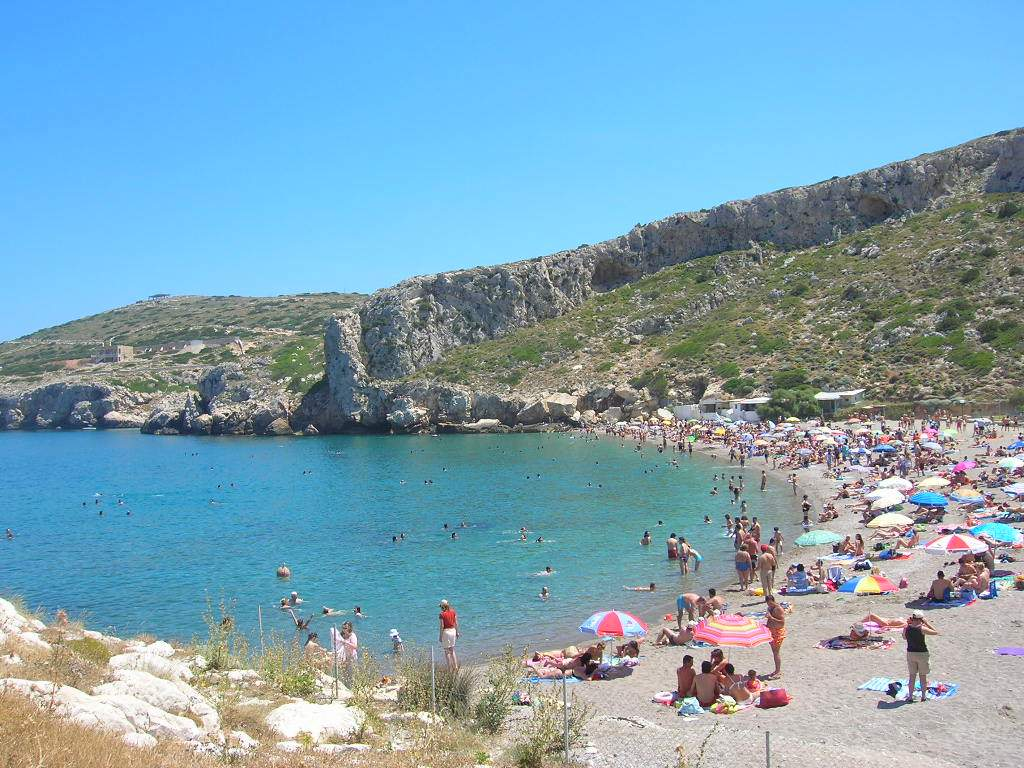
- A beach on the sea the town is named for

- Location within Greece
- Coordinates: 37°50′19″N 24°2′54″E
- Country: Greece
- Administrative region: Attica
- Regional unit: East Attica
- Municipality: Lavreotiki
- Municipal unit: Keratea
- Elevation: 23 m (75 ft)

Population (2021)
  - Total: 165
- Time zone: UTC+2 (EET)
  - Summer (DST): UTC+3 (EEST)

Kaki Thalassa (Greek: Κακή Θάλασσα) is a Mediterranean port town located in the municipality of Lavreotiki, East Attica, Greece, 30 km southeast of the nation's capital, Athens. Kaki Thalassa is 23 meters (75 ft) above sea level. A rural town, it had a total population of 165 according to the 2021 Greek census.

Prior to the 2011 Kallikratis local government reform program, Kaki Thalassa was part of the municipality of Keratea.

The town's name, literally translated, means evil sea, from κακή (the nominative singular form of κακός), meaning bad or evil, and the (feminine gendered) noun θάλασσα, meaning sea.

== Climate ==
Kaki Thalassa (Κακή Θάλασσα)

Climate chart (precipitation, max. and min. temperature)
J	F	M	A	M	J	J	A	S	O	N	D
82 10 3	100 12 8	38 13 7	37 22 10	22 29 16	14 33 19	5 38 24	4 37 24	20 31 20	50 22 16	130 20 13	146 13 9
- █ Average max. and min. temperatures in °C
- █ Precipitation totals in mm
Imperial conversion
J	F	M	A	M	J	J	A	S	O	N	D
3.2 50 37	3.9 54 46	1.5 55 45	1.5 72 50	0.9 84 61	0.6 91 66	0.2 100 75	0.2 99 75	0.8 88 68	2 72 61	5.1 68 55	5.7 55 48
- █ Average max. and min. temperatures in °F
- █ Precipitation totals in inches
