= Cephale =

Coordinates: 37°48′42″N 23°59′47″E

Cephale or Kephale (Ancient Greek: Κεφαλή) was a deme of ancient Attica of the phyle Acamantis, that appears, from the order in which it occurs in the list of Pausanias, to have been situated south or east of Hymettus, perhaps in the neighbourhood of Brauron, where Ludwig Ross found an inscription containing the name of this deme. Cephale possessed a temple of the Dioscuri, who were here called the Great Gods.

The site of Cephale is located east of modern Keratea.
