= Coprus =

Coordinates: 38°02′52″N 23°33′27″E

Coprus or Kopros (Ancient Greek: Κόπρος) was a deme of ancient Athens, of the phyle of Hippothontis, sending two delegates to the Athenian Boule. One of the characters of Aristophanes's The Knights is from this deme.

Its site is located near east of Eleusis.
