= Thyrgonidae =

Thyrgonidae or Thyrgonidai (Ancient Greek: Θυργωνίδαι) was a deme of ancient Attica, probably in the neighbourhood of Aphidna. Thyrgonidae, together with Aphidna, Perrhidae, and Titacidae, are said to have been removed from the phyle of Aeantis to another tribe.

Its site is unlocated.
