= Pefka, Attica =

Seaside town in Greece

Coordinates: 37°48′N 24°04′E

Pefka (Greek: Πεύκα), also known as Vgethi (Greek: Βγέθι), is a seaside town in East Attica, Greece. Since the 2011 local government reform it is part of the municipality Lavreotiki. Its population is 238 (2021). Vgethi is a quiet place only with scattered little houses and a beach which is visited, not only by the residents, but other people from the city and the suburbs too. It is located near Keratea from the North and to the South it is connected with Lavrio. It can be reached from the city through Lavriou Street.
