= Titacidae =

Titacidae or Titakidai (Ancient Greek: Τιτακίδαι) was a deme of ancient Attica, probably in the neighbourhood of Aphidna. Titacidae, together with Aphidna, Perrhidae, and Thyrgonidae, are said to have been removed from the phyle of Aeantis to another tribe. Perrhidae is described as a deme in Aphidna; and that Titacidae was in the same locality may be inferred from the story of the capture of Aphidna by the Dioscuri in consequence of the treachery of Titacus.

Its site is unlocated.
