= Philippus of Chollidae =

Philippus of Chollidae (Ancient Greek: Φίλιππος Χολλιδεύς) was an Athenian landowner of the 4th century BC. His property bordered Plato's estate at Iphistiadae to the west. He is known from Plato's will, preserved by Diogenes Laërtius.
