= Legrena =

Legrena Λεγρενά
- Settlement
- Location within Greece
- Coordinates: 37°39.9′N 23°59.7′E
- Country: Greece
- Administrative region: Attica
- Regional unit: East Attica
- Municipality: Lavreotiki
- Municipal unit: Lavreotiki

Population (2021)
  - Total: 345
- Time zone: UTC+2 (EET)
  - Summer (DST): UTC+3 (EEST)

Legrena (Greek: Λεγρενά) is a coastal village in East Attica in southern Greece on the coast of the Attica peninsula. It is part of the municipality Lavreotiki. It lies along Greek National Road 91, to the west of Sounion. It contains an extensive beach and bay of the same name. The European Public Law Center is located in the vicinity.
