= Iphistiadae =

Coordinates: 38°03′08″N 23°47′12″E

Iphistiadae (Ancient Greek: Ἰφιστιάδαι, romanized: Iphistiadai) or Hephaestiadae (Ancient Greek: Ἡφαιστιάδαι, romanized: Hephaistiadai) was one of the demes, or townships of Acamantis, one of the ten phylae of Attica established by Cleisthenes at the end of the sixth century BC. It seems to have been named for Iphistius, an obscure hero, with the alternative form, Hephaestiadae, arising from the mistaken assumption that it was named after the god Hephaestus, a much more familiar figure. The two names misled the geographer William Martin Leake to identify Iphistiadae and Hephaestiadae as two separate demes. Iphistiadae is mentioned in the Ethnica of Stephanus of Byzantium, and the lexicon of Hesychius of Alexandria.

Plato owned an estate at Iphistiadae, which by will he left to a certain youth named Adeimantus, presumably a younger relative, as Plato had an elder brother or uncle by this name. Diogenes Laërtius describes the provision:

These things have been left and devised by Plato: the estate in Iphistiadae, bounded on the north by the road from the temple at Cephisia, on the south by the temple of Heracles in Iphistiadae, on the east by the property of Archestratus of Phrearrhi, on the west by that of Philippus of Chollidae: this it shall be unlawful for anyone to sell or alienate, but it shall be the property of the boy Adeimantus to all intents and purposes...

According to this passage, Iphistiadae was home to a Heracleion, or temple of Heracles, from which the modern municipality of Heraklion, corresponding to the location of ancient Iphistiadae, derives its name. Thus, Iphistiadae was about five miles northeast of Athens, two miles west of Athmonon (modern Marousi), and three miles southwest of Cephisia (modern Kifissia).

== Bibliography ==
- Diogenes Laërtius, Lives and Opinions of Eminent Philosophers.
- Dictionary of Greek and Roman Geography, William Smith, ed., Little, Brown and Company, Boston (1854).
