= Cholleidae =

Cholleidae or Cholleidai (Ancient Greek: Χολλεῖδαι), or Chollidae or Chollidai (Χολλίδαι), was a deme of ancient Attica. It is supposed to have been near the Nymphaeum, or Grotto of the Nymphs, situated at the southern end of Mount Hymettus, and about three miles (5 km) from Vari by the road. From the inscriptions in this cave, we learn that it was dedicated to the nymphs and the other rustic deities by Archedemus of Pherae, who had been enrolled in the deme of Cholleidae. Hence it is inferred that the grotto was, in all probability, situated in this deme.

The exact site of Cholleidae is unlocated.

== People ==
- Philippus of Chollidae
