= Athens in the 5th century BC =

Golden Age of Athens, 480–404 BCE

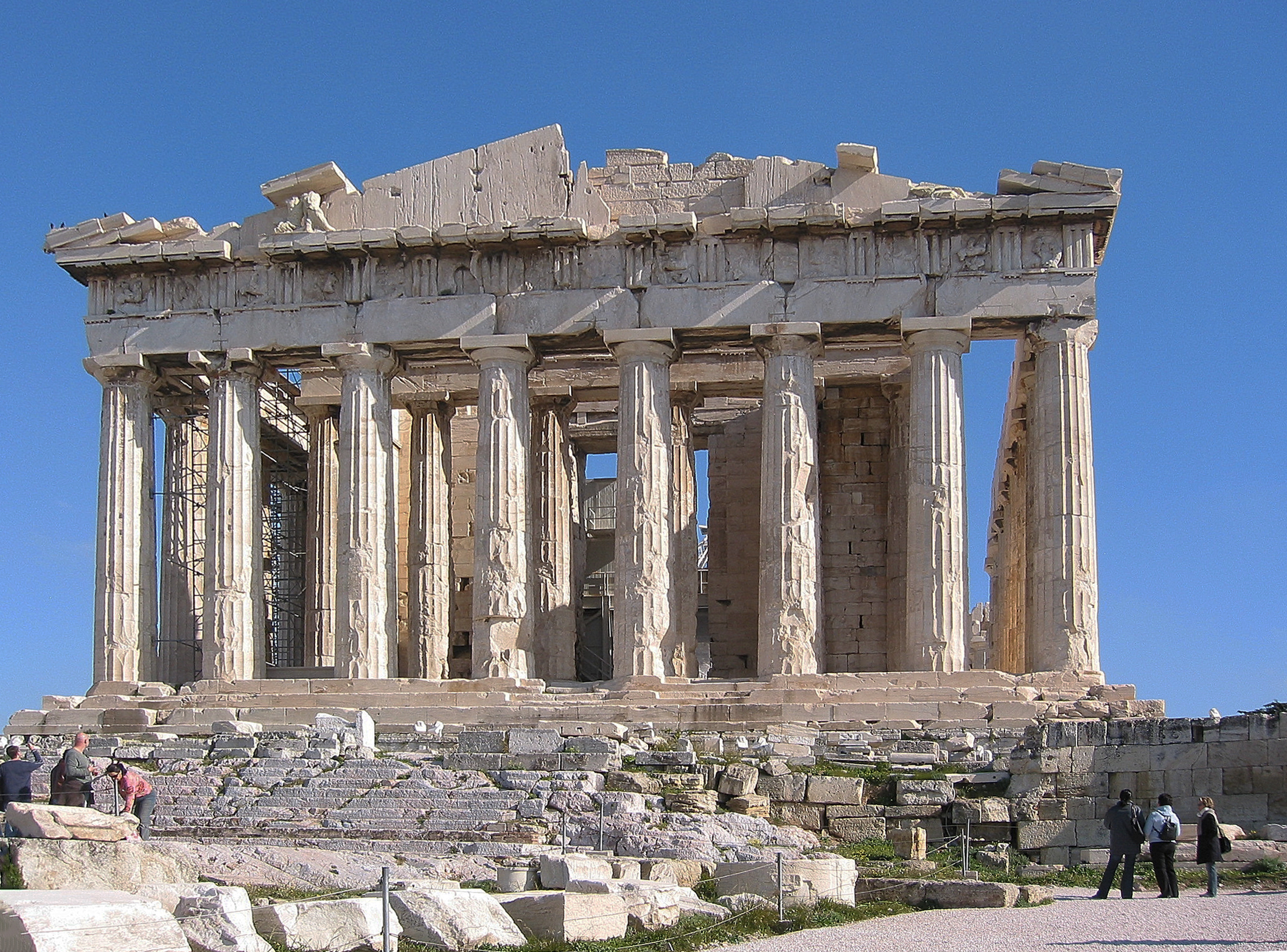
The Parthenon of Athens, built in the 5th century BC following the Greek victory in the Persian wars.

The Golden Age of Athens refers to the ancient Greek city-state of Athens in the 5th century BC. This era is traditionally heralded to having begun in 478 BC, after the defeat of the Persian invasion, when an Athenian-led coalition of city-states, known as the Delian League, confronted the Persians to keep the liberated Greek cities of coastal Asia Minor free. It was buoyed by political hegemony, economic growth accompanied by artistic and cultural flourishing.

After peace was made with Persia in the mid-5th century BC, what started as an Athenian-led alliance of independent city-states, had become an Athenian empire since Athens abandoned the pretense of parity among its allies and relocated the Delian League treasury from Delos to Athens, where it funded the building of the Athenian Acropolis, put half its population on the public payroll, and maintained its position as the dominant naval power in the Greek world. With the empire's funds, military dominance and its political fortunes guided by statesman and orator Pericles, Athens produced some of the most influential and enduring cultural artifacts of the Western tradition. The playwrights Aeschylus, Sophocles and Euripides all lived and worked in 5th-century BC Athens, as did the historians Herodotus and Thucydides, the physician Hippocrates and the philosophers Plato and Socrates. Athens's patron goddess was Athena, from whom it derived the name.

== Overview ==
During the golden age, Athenian military and external affairs were mostly entrusted to the ten generals who were elected each year by the ten tribes of citizens, who could be relied on rather than the variable-quality magistrates chosen by lot under the democracy. These strategoi were given duties which included planning military expeditions, receiving envoys of other states and directing diplomatic affairs. During the time of the ascendancy of Ephialtes as leader of the democratic faction, Pericles was his deputy. When Ephialtes was assassinated for overthrowing the elitist Council of the Aeropagus, Pericles stepped in and was elected in 445 BC, a post he held continuously until his death in 429 BC, always by election of the Athenian Assembly.

Pericles was a great speaker; this quality brought him tremendous success in the Assembly, presenting his vision of politics. One of his most popular reforms was to allow thetes (Athenians without wealth) to occupy public office. Another success of his administration was the creation of the misthophoria (μισθοφορία, which literally means paid function), a special salary for the citizens that attended the courts as jurors. This way, these citizens were able to dedicate themselves to public service without facing financial hardship. With this system, Pericles succeeded in keeping the courts full of jurors (Ath. Pol. 27.3), and in giving the people experience in public life. As Athens' ruler, he made the city the first and most important polis of the Greek world, acquiring a resplendent culture and democratic institutions.

The sovereign people governed themselves, without intermediaries, deciding matters of state in the Assembly. Athenian citizens were free and only owed obedience to their laws and respect to their gods. They achieved equality of speech in the Assembly: the word of a poor person had the same worth as that of a rich person. The censorial classes did not disappear, but their power was more limited; they shared the fiscal and military offices but they did not have the power of distributing privileges.

The principle of equality granted to all citizens had dangers since a number of citizens were incapable of exercising political rights due to their extreme poverty or ignorance. To avoid this, Athenian democracy applied itself to the task of helping the poorest in this manner:

- Concession of salaries to public functionaries.
- To seek and supply work to the poor.
- To grant lands to dispossessed villagers.
- Public assistance for war widows, invalids, orphans and indigents.
- Other social help.

Most importantly, and in order to emphasize the concept of equality and discourage corruption and patronage, practically all public offices that did not require a particular expertise were appointed by lot and not by election. Among those selected by lot to a political body, specific office was always rotated so that every single member served in all capacities in turn. This was meant to ensure that political functions were instituted in such a way as to run smoothly, regardless of each official's individual capacity.

These measures appear to have been carried out in great measure since the testimony has come to us from (among others) the Greek historian Thucydides (c. 460–400 BC), who comments: "Everyone who is capable of serving the city meets no impediment, neither poverty, nor civic condition..."

== Institutions ==
=== The magistrates ===
The magistrates were people who occupied a public post and formed the administration of the Athenian state. They were submitted to rigorous public control. The magistrates were chosen by lot, using fava beans. Black and white beans were put in a box and depending on which color the person drew out they obtained the post or not. This was a way of eliminating the personal influence of rich people and possible intrigues and use of favors. There were only two categories of posts not chosen by lot, but by election in the Popular Assembly. These were strategoi, or general, and magistrate of finance. It was generally supposed that significant qualities were needed to exercise each of those two offices. A magistrate's post did not last more than a year, including that of the strategos and in this sense the continued selection of Pericles year after year was an exception. At the end of every year, a magistrate would have to give an account of his administration and use of public finances.

The most honored posts were the ancient archontes, or archons in English. In previous ages they had been the heads of the Athenian state, but in the Age of Pericles they lost their influence and power, although they still presided over tribunals.

Every year the citizens elected ten "strategoi" (singular "strategos"), or generals, who served as both military officers and diplomats. It was through this position that Pericles shaped 5th-century BC Athens.

There were also more than forty public administration officers and more than sixty to police the streets, the markets, to check weights and measures and to carry out arrests and executions.

=== The Assembly of the People ===
The Assembly (in Greek, ἐκκλησία, that is to say, an assembly by summons), was the first organ of the democracy. In theory it brought together in assembly all the citizens of Athens, however the maximum number which came to congregate is estimated at 6,000 participants. The gathering place was a space on the hill called Pnyx, in front of the Acropolis. The sessions sometimes lasted from dawn to dusk. The ecclesia occurred forty times a year.

The Assembly decided on laws and decrees which were proposed. Decisions relied on ancient laws that had long been in force. Bills were voted on in two stages: first the Assembly itself decided and afterwards the Council or βουλή gave definitive approval.

=== The Council or Boule ===
The Council or Boule (βουλή) consisted of 500 members, fifty from each tribe, functioning as an extension of the Assembly. These were chosen by chance, using the system described earlier, from which they were familiarly known as "councillors of the bean"; officially they were known as prytaneis (πρύτανις, meaning "chief" or "teacher").

The council members examined and studied legal projects, supervised the magistrates and saw that daily administrative details were on the right path. They oversaw the city state's external affairs. They also met at Pnyx hill, in a place expressly prepared for the event. The fifty prytaneis in power were located on grandstands carved into the rock. They had stone platforms which they reached by means of a small staircase of three steps. On the first platform were the secretaries and scribes; the orator would climb up to the second. Any one who became unpopular would be kicked out and would be brought to another city.

== Finances ==
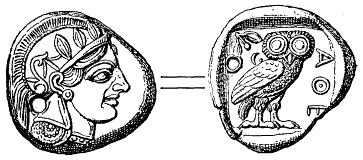
Reproduction of an Athenian tetradrachm with the image of Pallas Athena—protector of the city—on the front and an owl—symbol of wisdom—on the back (c. 490 BC)

The economic resources of the Athenian State would not have been possible without the treasury of the Delian League. The treasury was originally held on the island of Delos, but Pericles moved it to Athens under the pretext that Delos wasn't safe enough. This resulted in internal friction within the league and the rebellion of some city-states that were members. Athens retaliated quickly and some scholars believe this to be the period wherein it would be more appropriate to discuss an Athenian Empire instead of a league.

Other small incomes came from customs fees and fines. In times of war, a special tax was levied on rich citizens. These citizens were also charged permanently with other taxes for the good of the city. This was called the system of liturgy. The taxes were used to maintain the triremes which gave Athens great naval power and to pay and maintain a chorus for large religious festivals. It is believed that rich Athenian men saw it as an honor to sponsor the triremes (probably because they became leaders of it for the period they supported it) or the festivals and they often engaged in competitive donating.

Athens also benefited from a proximity to the trading port of Piraeus. The state of Athens collected a duty on cargo passing through the port. At Piraeus (the main port of Athens), this tax was set at 1% or higher on goods.

== Age of Pericles ==
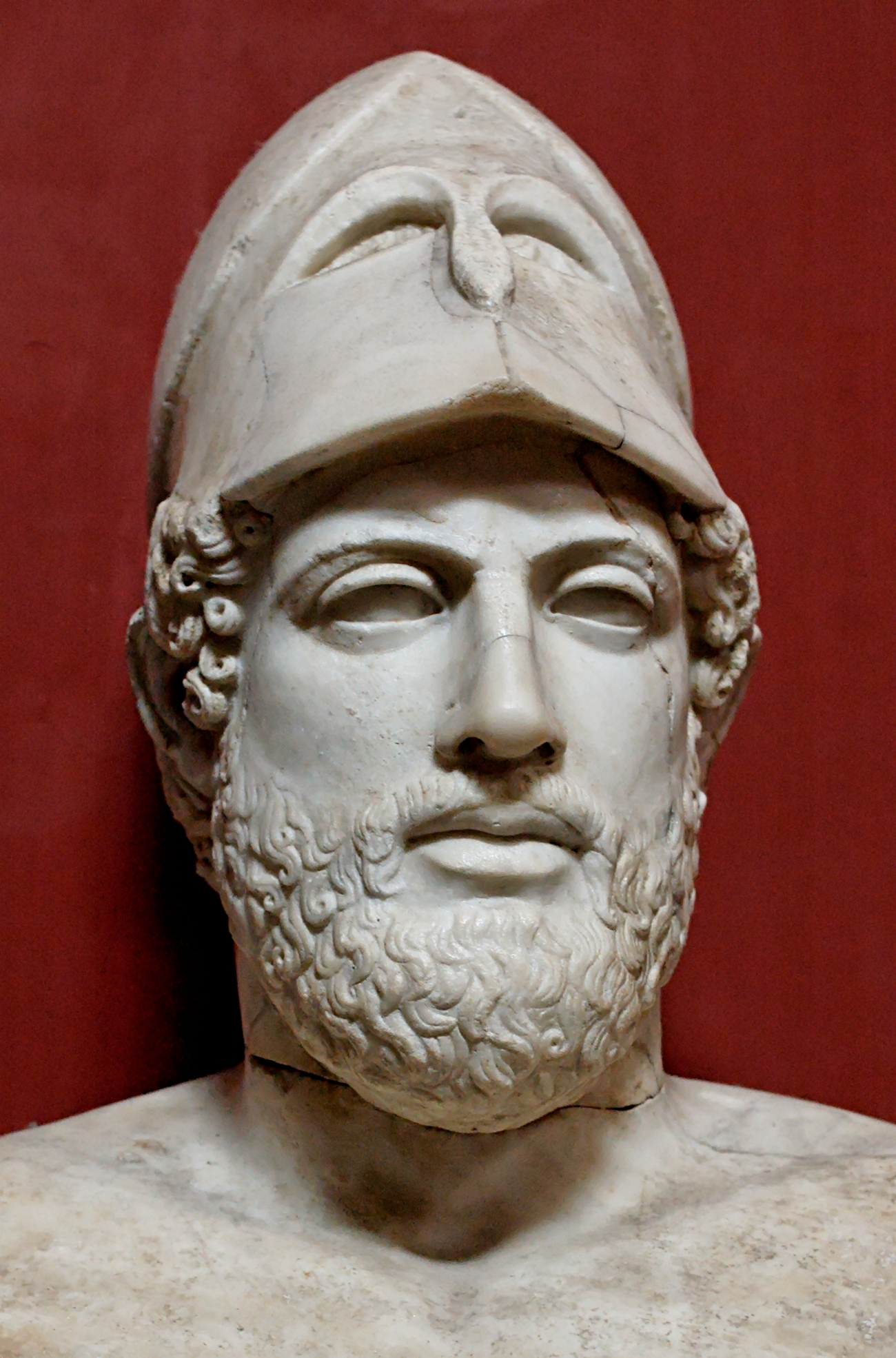
Bust of Pericles, marble Roman copy after a Greek original from c. 430 BC

The Athenian elite lived modestly and without great luxuries, compared to the elites of other ancient states. There were few great fortunes and land ownership was not concentrated: 71–73% of the citizen population owned 60–65% of the land, whereas the Gini coefficient for citizen population has been calculated as 0.708. The economy was based on maritime commerce and manufacturing, according to Amemiya's estimates, 56% of Athens' GDP was derived from manufacturing. Agriculture was also important, but it did not produce enough to feed the populace, so most food had to be imported (it is estimated that the carrying capacity of Attica's soil was between 84,000 and 150,000, while the population was 300,000 to 350,000 in 431 BC).

The state oversaw all the major religious festivals. The most important one was the Panathenaia in honor of the goddess Athena, a ritual procession carried out once a year in May and once every four years in July, in which the town presented a new veil (peplos) to the old wooden statue of Athena Poliada. Phidias immortalized this procession in the frieze of the Parthenon, which is currently at the British Museum. In the July Panathenaia (Great Panathenaia), large competitions were organized which included gymnastics and horseback riding, the winners of which received amphoras full of sacred olive oil as a prize. The other important festival was the dramatic Dionysia in honour of Dionysus where tragedies and comedies were performed.

=== Education ===
The education of boys began in their own home up until the age of seven when they had to attend school. There, they had several teachers who taught them to read and write, as well as subjects such as mathematics and music. Boys also had to take part in physical education classes where they were prepared for future military service with activities such as wrestling, racing, jumping and gymnastics. At eighteen they served in the army and were instructed on how to bear arms. Physical education was intense and some of the boys ended up becoming true athletes. In addition to these compulsory lessons, the students had the chance to discuss and learn from the great philosophers, grammarians and orators of the time. Some poor people had to stay at home and help their parents. However, Aristophanes and Socrates, though they were poor, became famous and successful.

=== Women ===
The primary role of free women in classical Athens was to marry and bear children. The emphasis on marriage as a way to perpetuate the family through childbearing had changed from archaic Athens, when (at least amongst the powerful) marriages were as much about making beneficial connections as they were about perpetuating the family. Married women were responsible for the day-to-day running of the household. At marriage, they assumed responsibility for the prosperity of their husband's household and the health of its members. Their primary responsibilities were bearing, raising and caring for children, weaving cloth and making clothes. They would also have been responsible for caring for ill household members, supervising slaves, and ensuring that the household had sufficient food. In classical Athenian marriages, husband or wife could legally initiate a divorce. The woman's closest male relative (who would be her kyrios if she were not married) could also do so, apparently even against the couple's wishes. After divorce, the husband was required to return the dowry or pay 18 percent interest annually so the woman's livelihood would continue and she could remarry. If there were children at the time of the divorce, they remained in their father's house and he remained responsible for their upbringing.

In some cases, Athenian women had the same rights and responsibilities as Athenian men. However, Athenian women did have some significant disabilities at law compared to their male counterparts. Like slaves and metics, they were denied political freedom, citizenship and voting rights, being excluded from the law courts and the Assembly. Women ideally remained apart from men. However it was recognised that an ideology of separation could not be practiced by many Athenians. In Politics, Aristotle asked: "How is it possible to prevent the wives of the poor from going out of doors?" In practice, only wealthy families would have been able to implement this ideology. Women's responsibilities would have forced them to leave the house frequently – to fetch water from the well or wash clothing, for example. Although wealthy families may have had slaves to enable free women to remain in the house, most would not have had enough slaves to prevent free women from leaving at all.

The cult of Athena Polias (the city's eponymous goddess) was central to Athenian society, reinforcing morality and maintaining societal structure. Women played a key role in the cult; the priestesshood of Athena was a position of great importance, and the priestess could use her influence to support political positions. According to Herodotus, before the Battle of Salamis the priestess of Athena encouraged the evacuation of Athens by telling the Athenians that the snake sacred to Athena (which lived on the Acropolis) had already left.

== Arts and literature ==
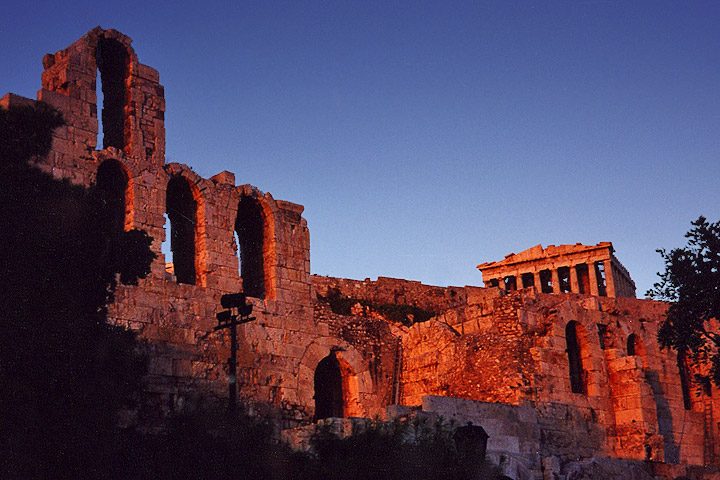
View of the Acropolis

Historians consider the Athenian 5th and 6th centuries BC as the Golden Age of sculpture and architecture. In this period the ornamental elements and the technique employed did not vary from the previous period. What characterizes this period is the quantity of works and the refinement and perfection of the works. Most were religious in nature, mainly sanctuaries and temples. Some examples from this period are:

- The reconstruction of the Temple of Olympian Zeus.
- The reconstruction of the Temple of Apollo in Delphi, which was destroyed by an earthquake.
- The reconstruction of the Acropolis of Athens, the marble city for the glory of the gods. The site had suffered from a fire started by the Persians and lay in ruins for more than 30 years. Pericles initiated its reconstruction with white marble brought from the nearby quarry of Pentelicon. The best architects, sculptors and workers were gathered to complete the Acropolis. The construction lasted 20 years. Financing came from the Delian League.

=== Sculpture ===
Phidias is considered the greatest sculptor of this era. He created colossal gold-plated ivory statues ("chryselephantine statues"), generally face and hands, which were highly celebrated and admired in his own time: Athena, situated in the interior of the Parthenon, whose splendor reached the faithful through the open doors, and Zeus in the Sanctuary of Olympia, considered in its age and in later ages to be one of the marvels of the world.

According to Pliny the Elder's Natural History, in order to conserve the marble of these sculptures, oil receptacles were placed in the temples so that the ivory would not crack.

The other great sculptors of this century were Myron and Polycletus.

=== Pottery ===
During this age, the production of ceramic pieces was abundant. Amphorae were produced in mass quantity due to the heavy trading with other cities all around the Mediterranean. Large evidence of amphorae from this era can be found around every major ancient port as well as in the Aegean sea. During this period is also seen an abundance of white background ceramics which are much more delicate than the previously popular yellow and black background ceramics. These ceramics were often used to keep perfume or for mortuary rites, including decorations on graves. It is also known that there were a number of great painters, but their works are lost, both frescos and free-standing paintings.

=== Theatre ===
The theatre reached its greatest height in the 5th century BC. Pericles promoted and favored the theatre with a series of practical and economic measures. The wealthiest families were obligated to care for and to sustain the choruses and actors. By this means, Pericles maintained the tradition according to which theatrical performances served the moral and intellectual education of the people. Plays were made by men and usually for men, and this platform was often used to reinforce the patriarchy.

Athens became the great city of Greek theatre. Theatrical performances lasted eight consecutive hours and were performed as part of a competition in which a jury proclaimed a winner. While the decor of the provisional theatres was simple, the permanent theatrical venues of ancient Athens eventually became more sumptuous and elaborate. No matter the performance venue, plays were performed by, at most, three actors, who wore masks to identify them with the characters they portrayed; they were accompanied by a chorus who sang and danced.

The dramatic poets from this era whose plays have survived are:

- Aeschylus
- Sophocles
- Euripides
- Aristophanes

=== Philosophy ===
The Golden Age featured some of the most renowned Western philosophers of all time. Chief among these were Socrates, whose ideas exist primarily in a series of dialogues by his student Plato, who mixed them with his own; Plato; and Plato's student, Aristotle.

Other notable philosophers of the Golden Age included Anaxagoras; Democritus (who first inquired as to what substance lies within all matter, the earliest known proposal of what is now called the atom or its sub-units); Empedocles; Hippias; Isocrates; Parmenides; Heraclitus; and Protagoras.

In the second half of the 5th century BC the name of sophist (from the Greek sophistês, expert, teacher, man of wisdom) was given to the teachers that gave instruction on diverse branches of science and knowledge in exchange for a fee.

In this age, Athens was the "school of Greece." Pericles and his mistress Aspasia had the opportunity to associate with not only the great Athenians thinkers of their day but also other Greek and foreign scholars. Among them were the philosopher Anaxagoras, the architect Hippodamus of Miletus, who reconstructed Peiraeus, as well as the historians Herodotus (484–425), Thucydides (460–400), and Xenophon (430–354).

Athens was also the capital of eloquence. Since the late 5th century BC, eloquence had been elevated to an art form. There were the logographers (λογογράφος) who wrote courses and created a new literary form characterized by the clarity and purity of the language. It became a lucrative profession. It is known that the logographer Lysias (460–380 BC) made a great fortune thanks to his profession. Later, in the 4th century BC, the orators Isocrates and Demosthenes also became famous.

== End of the Age of Pericles ==
From 461 until his death in 429 BC Pericles was active in the government of Athens, an era of splendour and a standard of living higher than any previously experienced. All was well within the internal government, however discontent within the Delian League was ever increasing. The foreign affairs policies adopted by Athens did not produce the best results; members of the Delian League were increasingly dissatisfied. Athens was the city-state that dominated and subjugated the rest of Greece and these oppressed citizens wanted their independence.

Previously, in 550 BC, a similar league between the cities of the Peloponnessus—directed and dominated by Sparta—had been founded. Taking advantage of the general dissent of the Greek city-states, this Peloponnesian League began to confront Athens. After a long lasting series of poorly managed, hawkish policies, (c. 431 BC) and the ensuing Peloponnesian War the city of Athens finally lost its independence in 338 BC, when Philip II of Macedonia conquered the rest of Greece.

== See also ==
- Greece in the 5th century BC
- Axial Age
- Athenian military
