= G.S. Kerateas =

- Full name: Gymnastikos Syllogos Kerateas; Γυμναστικός Σύλλογος Κερατέας
- Founded: 1984
- Colours: Blue and White
- Website: www.keratea-ac.gr

G.S. Kerateas (Greek: Γ.Σ. Κερατέας), full name Gymnastikos Syllogos Kerateas (Greek: Γυμναστικός Σύλλογος Κερατέας), is a Greek multi-sport club that is located in Keratea, Attica and was founded in 1984.

The club runs a wide range of sports for all ages and skill levels, although it is most notable for its volleyball teams. The women's volleyball team have competed in Greek A1 Division as a professional team with a highlight of participation at the 2011 Greek Cup Final 4 against Olympiacos V.C. Currently competes in the semi-professional Greek B' National League.
