= Ceriadae =

Coordinates: 37°58′23″N 23°42′48″E

Ceriadae or Keiriadai (Ancient Greek: Κειριάδαι) was a deme of ancient Attica, of the phyle of Hippothontis, sending two delegates to the Boule. It was located outside of the walls of Themistocles, west of the hill of the Nymphs and west of the Pnyx. In this deme there was the baratharon (βάραθρον), a chasm into which criminals condemned to death were thrown.

The site of Ceriadae is west of the Pnyx.
