= Mesogeia =

Inland region of Attica, Greece

The Mesogeia or Mesogaia (Greek: τα Μεσόγεια, η Μεσόγαια/Μεσογαία, "Midlands") is a geographical region of Attica in Greece.

== History ==
The term designates since antiquity the inland portion of the Attic peninsula. The term acquired a technical meaning with the reforms of Cleisthenes in c. 508 BC, when each of the ten Attic tribes was in territory composed of three zones (trittyes), urban (asty, the main city of Athens), interior (mesogeia) and coastal (paralia). In the Classical period, the mesogeia comprised about 47 settlements (demoi).

In modern usage, the term refers to the central portion of East Attica, separated from the Athens basin by Mount Hymettus, and delineated to the north by Mount Penteli and to the south by the mountains of south Attica (Merenta, Panio, Laureotic Olympus). To the east the Mesogeia reaches the Aegean Sea at the Petalioi Gulf, but is separated from the actual coastline by a line of low hills. In the late Middle Ages, the area was the site of Arvanite settlement, as can be seen from toponyms such as Spata or Liopesi.

Before the 2011 Kallikratis reform, the area comprised the municipalities of Gerakas, Glyka Nera, Anthousa, Pallini, Paiania, Pikermi, Spata, Artemida, Rafina, Markopoulo Mesogaias, Keratea, Koropi, Kalyvia Thorikou, Vari, Kouvaras, and Voula. Its main settlement is Spata, and its main harbour is Rafina. The Athens International Airport is also located near Spata.

== Maps ==
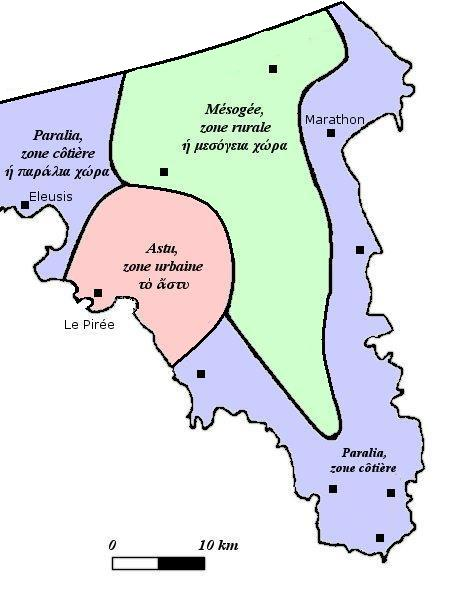
The division of Attica into urban (pink), inland (green), and coastal (blue) zones by Cleisthenes

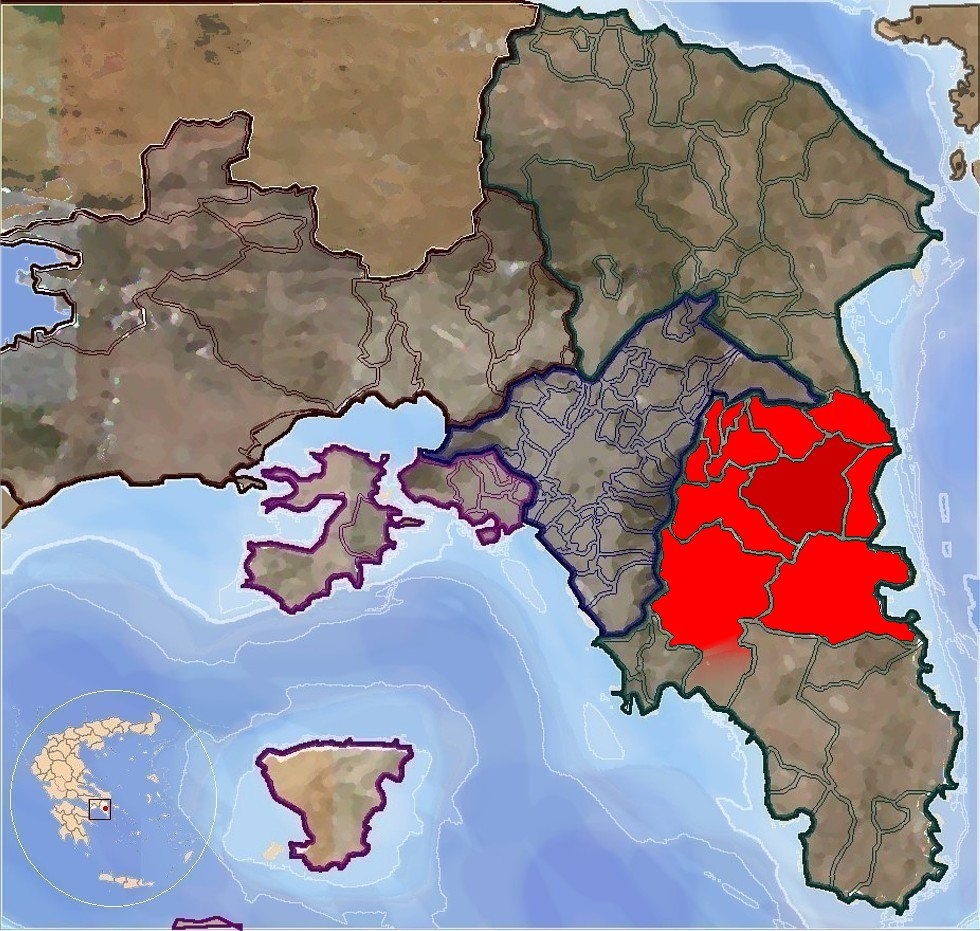
The modern extent of the Mesogeia area

== See also ==
- Mesogeia Painter
- Mesogeion Avenue

== Sources ==
- Koder, Johannes; Hild, Friedrich (1976). Tabula Imperii Byzantini, Band 1: Hellas und Thessalia (in German). Vienna: Verlag der Österreichischen Akademie der Wissenschaften. ISBN 978-3-7001-0182-6.
