= Kato Poseidonia =

Kato Poseidonia Κάτω Ποσειδωνία
- Settlement
- Location within Greece
- Coordinates: 37°40′N 24°3′E
- Country: Greece
- Administrative region: Attica
- Regional unit: East Attica
- Municipality: Lavreotiki
- Municipal unit: Lavreotiki

Population (2021)
  - Total: 337
- Time zone: UTC+2 (EET)
  - Summer (DST): UTC+3 (EEST)

Kato Poseidonia (or Kato Posidonia) is a settlement in Southeastern Attica under the administration of the Municipality of Lavreotiki. The settlement is 36.7 miles from Athens, 2.5 miles from Lavrio, and 3 miles from Sounio.
