= European Public Law Center =

Legal non-profit in the European Union

European Public Law Center (EPLC) was a non-profit institution of international character, founded on 16 November 1995 in Athens, Greece. The aim of the institute was to promote rule of law and democracy across the whole European Union and other countries. EPLC was initially located in downtown Athens, and later relocated its headquarters to Legrena, near Sounio, Attica.

EPLC was conceived by the European Group of Public Law and came into effect by a law of the Hellenic Parliament (law 2358/16.11.1995).

Spyridon Flogaitis was the director of EPLC from its foundation.

Foreign governments and universities had a right to be represented in EPLC's Board of Directors, and as of 2008 a dozen of governments were represented, together with 33 universities.

Evripidis Stilianidis worked as a researcher for EPLC from 1997 until 2000.

The European Public Law Organization (EPLO) was established in 2007 to continue the work of EPLC. Spyridon Flogaitis is the director of EPLO.

== Projects ==
EPLC formerly managed the Academy of European Public Law, an educational programme of European Public Law Organization (EPLO). Its working languages are English and French.
