= Eiresidae =

Coordinates: 37°59′52″N 23°42′47″E

Eiresidae or Eiresidai (Ancient Greek: Εἰρεσίδαι) was a deme of ancient Attica, west or southwest of Cephisia, and adjacent to Iphistiadae.

The site of Eiresidae is located west of modern Kolonos.
