= Coele =

Deme of ancient Attica

Coordinates: 37°58′10″N 23°43′04″E

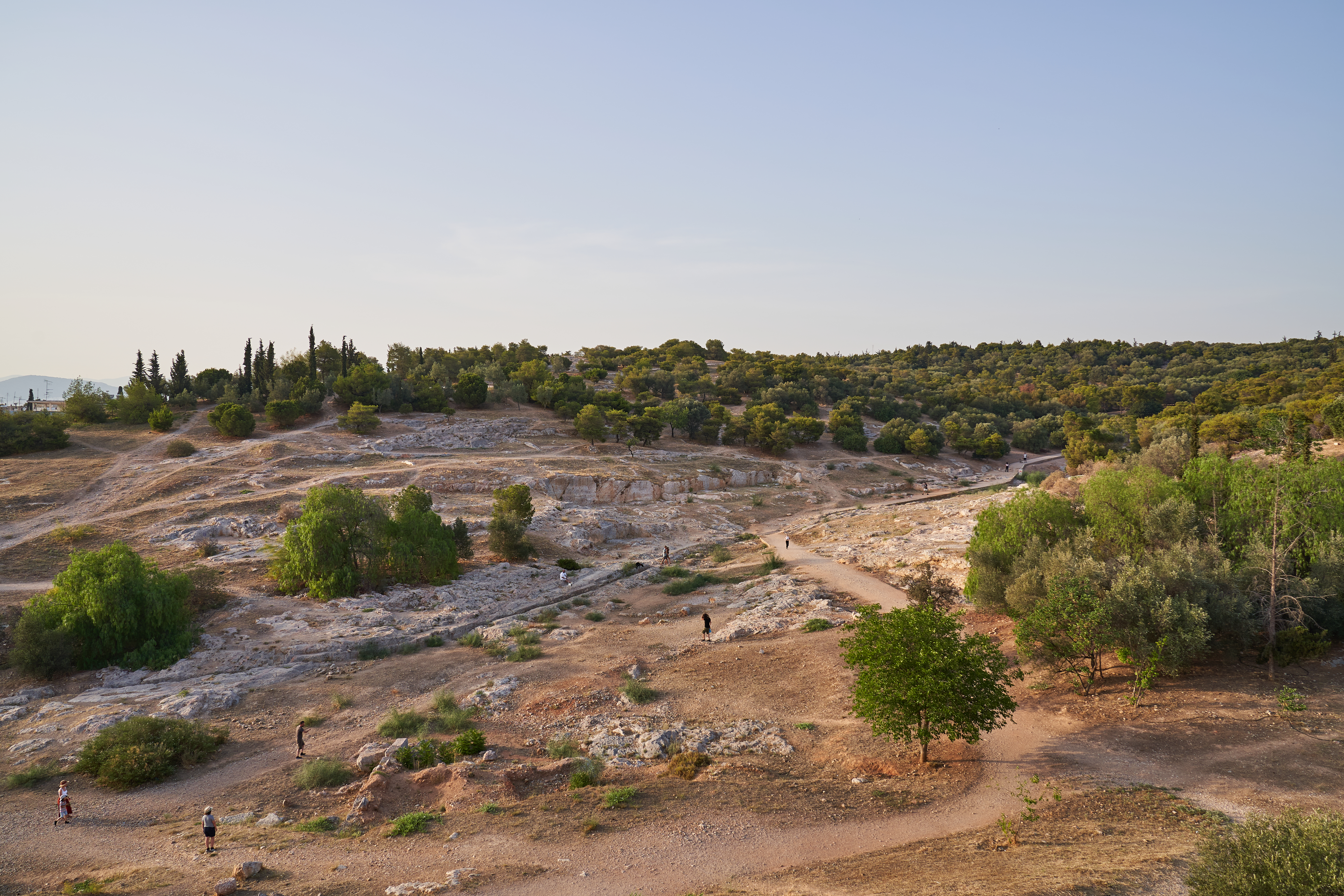
The archaeological site of the Deme of Koile (June 2021)

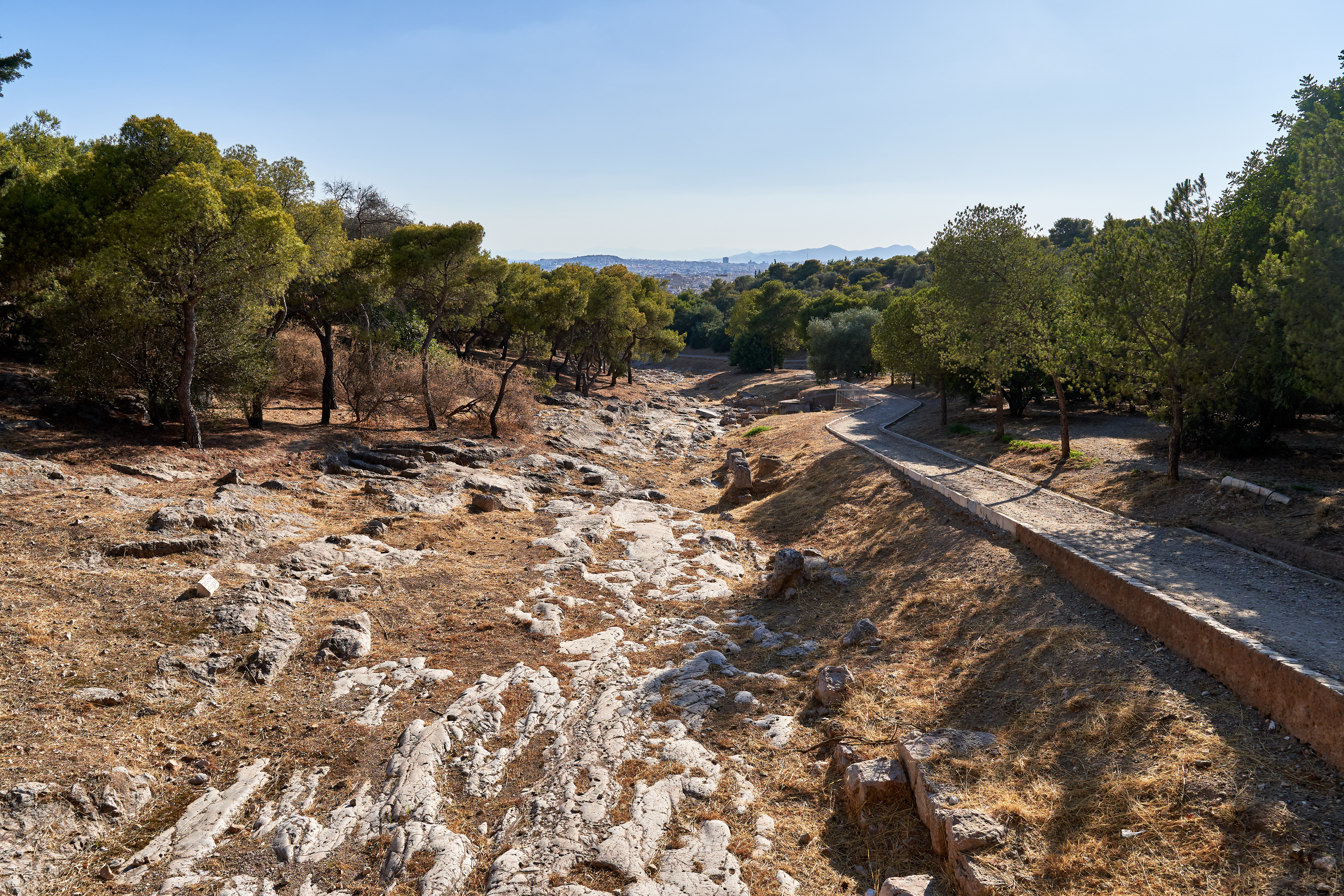
Remains of Koile road

Coele or Koile (Ancient Greek: Κοίλη or Κοιλή) was a deme of ancient Attica, originally of the phyle of Hippothontis, and between 307/6 BCE and 201/200 BCE of Demetrias (tribe), sending three delegates to the Boule. It was located partially inside and partially outside the Themistoclean Wall.

The most important monuments were the tomb of Cimon Coalemos (together with his horses, winners of the Olympics) and of the historian Thucydides. Following these sources, many historians thought that the deme was, at least in part, outside the city walls, since Cicero had written that it was illegal to bury the dead inside the walls. However, archaeological discoveries have shown that only a small part of the deme, that containing the tombs, developed outside the walls.

The deme had its own agora. In the Hellenistic period a wall was built to reinforce the defenses of the city through the deme, which was abandoned and used, in Roman times, as a cemetery.

The site of Coele is to the southwest of the Pnyx.
