= Xypete =

Coordinates: 37°57′27″N 23°41′08″E

Xypete (Ancient Greek: Ξυπέτη or Ξυπετῆ), also Xypeteum or Xypeteon (Ξυπετεών), was said to have been likewise called Troja (Τροία), because Teucrus led from hence an Attic colony into Phrygia, was a deme of ancient Attica. It was apparently near Peiraeeus or Phalerum, since Xypete, Peiraeeus, Phalerum, and Thymoetadae formed the τετράκωμοι, which had a temple of Heracles in common (τετράκωμον Ἡρακλεῖον).

The site of Xypete is tentatively located northeast of Peiraieus.
