= Thymoetadae =

Deme of ancient Attica

Coordinates: 37°58′03″N 23°37′12″E

Thymoetadae or Thymoitadai (Ancient Greek: Θυμοιτάδαι) or Thymaetedae or Thymaitadai (Θυμαιτάδαι), was a deme of ancient Attica. It derived its name from Thymoetas, a king of Attica, possessed a port, from which Theseus secretly set sail on his expedition to Crete. This retired port seems to have been the same as the Phoron Limen (Φώρων λιμήν) or “Thieves' port,” so called from its being frequented by smugglers. It is a small circular harbour at the entrance to the bay of Salamis. Xypete, Peiraeeus, Phalerum, and Thymoetadae formed the τετράκωμοι, which had a temple of Heracles in common (τετράκωμον Ἡρακλεῖον). It was situated on the Attic side of the Strait of Salamis; and it was from the heights of Aegaleos, above this temple, that Xerxes I witnessed the Battle of Salamis. The σισύραι, or garments of goatskins of Thymoetadae, appear to have been celebrated.

The site of Thymoetadae is located near Keratsini.
