= Paralia (Attica) =

Administrative unit (trittys) of ancient Attica, Greece

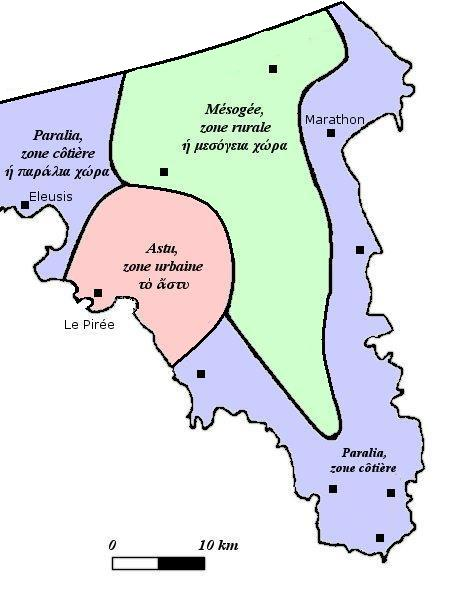
The division of Attica into urban (pink), inland (green), and coastal (blue) zones by Cleisthenes

The Paralia (Greek: Παραλία, lit. 'the sea-side/coast') was a geographical and administrative region (trittys) of ancient Attica.

The term designated the coasts of Attica, but was also generally used for the entire portion of Attica east of Mount Hymettus.

The term acquired a technical meaning with the reforms of Cleisthenes in c. 508 BC, when each of the ten Attic tribes was made to territory from comprise three zones (trittyes), urban (asty, the city of Athens), interior (mesogeia) and coastal (paralia). In the Classical period, the paralia comprised about 40 settlements (demoi).
