= Hermus (Attica) =

Coordinates: 38°01′09″N 23°40′00″E

Hermus or Hermos (Ancient Greek: Ἕρμος) was a deme of ancient Attica. It lay on the sacred road to Eleusis, between the Cephissus and the Pythium, a temple of Apollo on Mount Poecilum, upon a rivulet of the same name. Here was the splendid monument of Pythonice, the wife of Harpalus.

The site of Hermus is tentatively identified with Chaidari.
