= Trittys =

Ancient Athenian subdivision

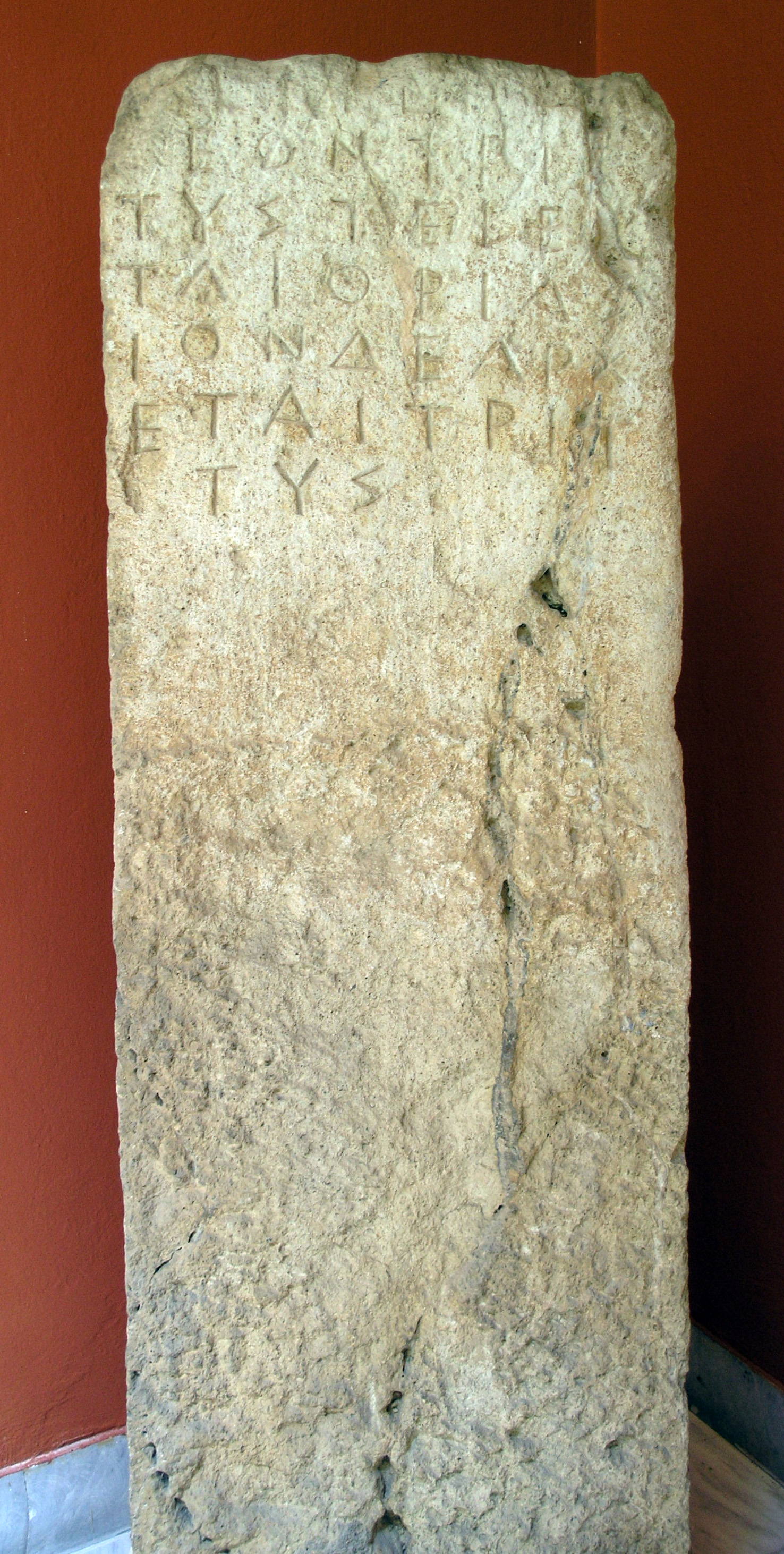
Horos (boundary stone) of the trittyes of Pedion and Thria (both tribe of Oineis), in Piraeus, mid-5th century BC.

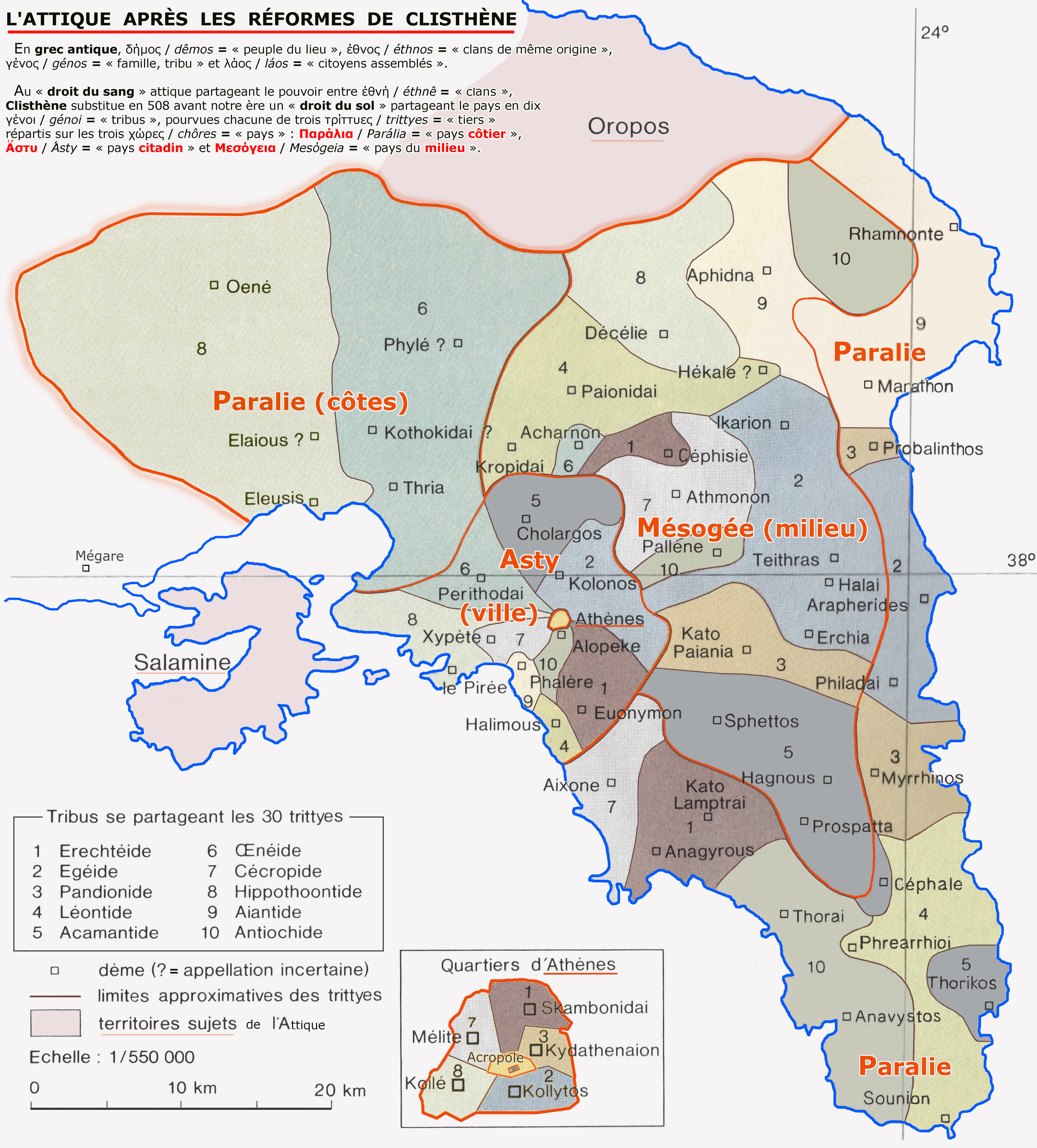
Map of ancient Attica divided into its thirty trittyes. Those belonging to the same phyle are numbered and coloured accordingly.

The trittyes (/ˈtrɪti.iːz/; Ancient Greek: τριττύες trittúes), singular trittys (/ˈtrɪtɪs/; τριττύς trittús) were part of the organizational structure that divided the population in ancient Attica, and is commonly thought to have been established by the reforms of Cleisthenes in 508 BC. The name trittys means "third", and is named such because there were three types of regions in each trittys. There were thirty trittyes and ten tribes (before Cleisthenes, there were only four tribes organized by royal families) named after local heroes in Attica. Trittyes were composed of one or more demes; demes were the basic unit of division in Attica, which were the smaller units of population that made up the trittyes. (see here - - for a very descriptive map of the demes and tribes).

== Origin ==
Cleisthenes is credited with this change in the way the Athenians and their surrounding city-states (the area that is referred to as Ancient Attica) were organized. He changed the original four tribes (that were based on family relations) into ten tribes, and formed them in order to represent the male general population as much as possible. This resulted in the formation of each of the 139 demes (subdivisions of smaller city-states) into groups of trittyes. The goal of this new organization was to spread out the areas, make the representation more equal and help them be distributed more evenly. The way that this distribution allowed a more equal spread of representation was that each tribe was composed of their respective trittyes, and each trittyes included areas from the coast (paralia), from the city (asty), and from the inland area (mesogeia). With this organization, one trittys/tribe was not composed of only city, costal or inland areas.

The trittys were formed as a way to have fair representation of all the peoples, whereas before the areas were not spread out as evenly or with as much emphasis on equal representation as with these reforms of Cleisthenes.

== Layout and Background ==
The trittyes were the larger denomination of tribes (Phyle) in Ancient Attica, and were formed by the demes that were near each other. The trittyes were often unequal in size and, with that, representation in the judicial aspects of Ancient Attica. The amount of representation for each trittys ranged from some areas having twenty-seven representatives (such as Coastal Antiochis (tribe)), to some areas having only nine representatives/councilors (such as the city section of Aiantis), with others not having much more. The amount of representation for each group does not appear to change drastically over time. Consistently, the city areas tended to have the least amount of representation, and the coastal areas had slightly more than the inland sections.

The smaller trittyes had fewer citizens in them and the larger ones had more, though there are exceptions. Individuals in the trittys consisted of resident aliens, slaves, and citizens (men aged 18 introduced to their respective deme by their father, thus making them a citizen of the trittys). Therefore, there was the possibility for there to be fewer citizens than a separate area but more residents in general compared to other areas.

== Function ==
There were two main functions for the trittyes. The first function is that of military organization - grouping areas in order to pull troops from - so that one type of area is not out of all their able bodied men in times of war (more spread out among groups).

The second reason is for more of a political organization necessity. The trittys was made up of people from all the three designated areas - the city, the coast and the inland areas. With this method of spreading out the population, the representation of a group is not limited to just those who live in the same area. So, when there are meetings in the city and it is easier for city citizens to attend than coastal citizens, all of the areas have some degree of representation (only male citizens were counted for representative purposes). This method of representation also prevented the nobles of the area to control any election results via bribes and other forms of influence, and led to a representation by population of the citizens in their respective areas.

== Example Organization of Trittys ==
This chart represents the original ten Phylai. This is included to show the distribution of city and coastal trittys in the original ten phylai.

THE BOULEUTIC ORGANIZATION OF THE ORIGINAL TEN PHYLAI
Trittys	Deme	Location	Evidence for Location
City	Epikephisia	Kephisos valley, near Lakiadai	General location, determined from patent etymology of the name and the findspot (Dipylon) of the deme-decree I.G., II2, 1205; cf. R.E., s.v. Epikephisia
City ?	Hippotomadai	Unknown	Little evidence for location; trittys assignment very tentative; cf. R.E., Suppl. X, s.v. Hippoto- madai
City	Lakiadai	Sacred Way, E of Kephisos	Location known with certainty from Pausanias (I, 37, 2); cf. Karten von Attika, Text, II, p. 16; R.E., s.v. Lakiad
City	Lousia	Kephisos valley, W of Athens	General location, suggested from slight literary evidence and the findspot of the grave marker I.G., II2, 6756 and the reference in I.G., II2, 1672, line 195; cf. R.E., s.v. Lusia; Judeich, Topographie2, p. 174
City	Perithoidai	Kephisos valley, W of Athens	General location, suggested from slight literary evidence and the findspot of the grave marker I.G., II2, 7219; cf. R.E., s.v. Perithoidai; Karten von Attika, Text, II, p. 1
City	Ptelea	Kephisos valley, W of Athens	General location, tentatively suggested from the findspot of a grave marker (cf. Hesperia, XXXV, 1966, p. 280, no. 7); cf. R.E., s.v. Ptelea
City ?	Tyrmeidai	Unknown	Little evidence for location; trittys assignment tentative; cf. R.E., Suppl. X, s.v. Tyrmeid
Coast	Kothokidai	Ag. Ioannes, N of Aspropyrgos	Deme-site (cf. Karten von Attika, Text, VII- VIII, p. 23), possible location for Kothokidai, the general location of which is suggested by the findspot (Goritsa) of the gravestone I.G., II2, 6481.
Coast	Oe	Site NE of Aspropyrgos, at foot of Kalistiri	Deme-site (cf. Philippson, Griech. Landschaften, I, part 3, p. 861, note 123), suitable for Oe, the general location of which is suggested by Sophocles (Oedipus at Kolonos, 1059ff.).

== See also ==
- Phyle
- Deme
- Ancient Attica
- Ancient Greece
- Cleisthenes
