= Lavreotiki =

Municipality in East Attica, Greece

Lavreotiki Λαυρεωτική
- Municipality
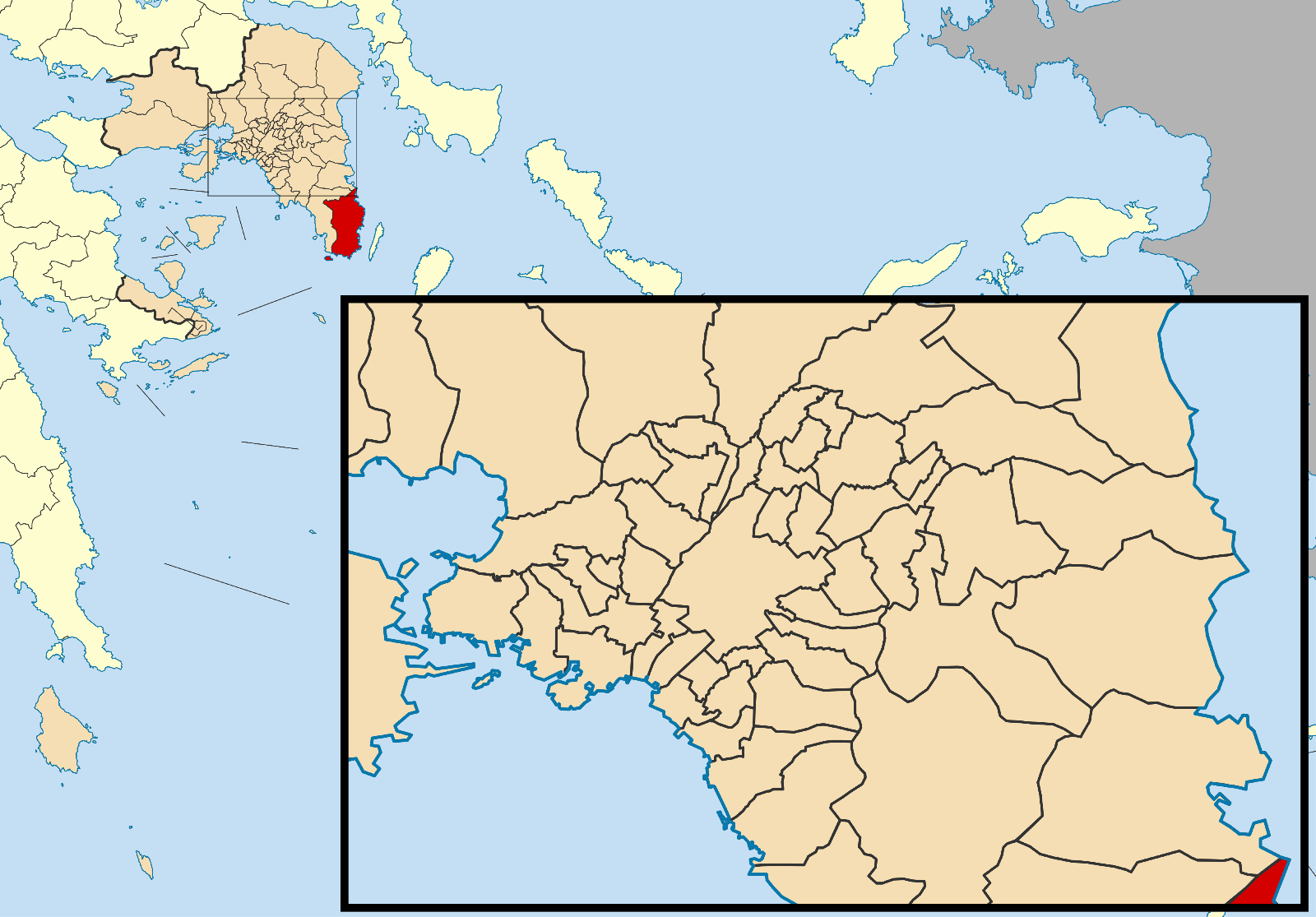

- Location within Greece
- Coordinates: 37°43′N 24°4′E
- Country: Greece
- Geographic region: Central Greece
- Administrative region: Attica
- Regional unit: East Attica
- Seat: Lavrio

Government
  - Mayor: Dimitrios Loukas (since 2014)

Area
  - Municipality: 175.80 km^{2} (67.88 sq mi)
  - Municipal unit: 35.484 km^{2} (13.700 sq mi)
- Elevation: 10 m (33 ft)

Population (2021)
  - Municipality: 25,199
  - Density: 143.34/km^{2} (371.25/sq mi)
  - Municipal unit: 10,046
  - Municipal unit density: 283.11/km^{2} (733.26/sq mi)
- Time zone: UTC+2 (EET)
  - Summer (DST): UTC+3 (EEST)
- Postal code: 195 xx
- Area code: 22920
- Website: www.lavreotiki.gr

Lavreotiki (Greek: Λαυρεωτική) is a municipality at the southeasternnmost tip of the Attica peninsula in the Greek regional unit of East Attica. Its municipal seat is the town of Lavrio.

It is historically important as a significant ancient mining district, most notably in the villages of Lavrio and Thorikos on the southeastern seaboard during the 6th, 5th, and 4th centuries BCE. As such it financed the wealth of Athens and the emergence of the Athenian Empire through the slave-powered mining efforts for silver and lead, beginning with the discovery of 2 deep-vein mining efforts during the 480's. Prior to that development, which at Themistocles urging in 483 BC led to the expansion of the Athenian fleet to 200 ships, only surface-mining was deployed as a technique for harvesting silver. More than 250 ore washeries have been identified by archaeologists and geologists in the district.

== Municipality ==
The municipality Lavreotiki was formed at the 2011 local government reform by the merger of the following 3 former municipalities, that became municipal units:

- Agios Konstantinos
- Keratea
- Lavreotiki

The municipality has an area of 175.798 km^{2}, the municipal unit 35.484 km^{2}.

=== Settlements ===
The settlements within the municipal unit of Lavreotiki are (population at 2021 census):

- Lavrio (7,525)
- Agios Ioannis Rossos (625)
- Legrena (345)
- Kato Poseidonia (337)
- Agios Gerasimos (290)
- Thoriko (262)
- Ano Thoriko (239)
- Panormos (235)
- Kato Sounio (164)
- Agrileza (24)

== Historical population ==
Year	Lavrio	Lavreotiki (mun. unit)	Lavreotiki (munic.)
1907	10,007	-	-
1981	10,124	-	-
1991	8,846	10,293	-
2001	8,558	10,612	-
2011	7,078	9,611	25,102
2021	7,525	10,046	25,199

== Sources ==
- Austin, M M., and P Vidal-Naquet. Economic and Social History of Ancient Greece: an Introduction. 1st English ed. Berkeley: University of California P, 1977. 1-397.
- Fine, John V. A. The Ancient Greeks: A Critical History. Harvard University Press, 1983
- Finley, M.I., The Ancient Economy. 2nd Ed. Berkeley: University of California Press, 1985, c1973
- Healy, John F. Mining and Metallurgy in the Greek and Roman World. London: Thames and Hudson, 1978.
- Hopper, R J. Trade and Industry in Classical Greece. London: Thames and Hudson, 1979. 6-240.
