= Cleisthenes =

6th-century BC Athenian lawgiver

- Κλεισθένης
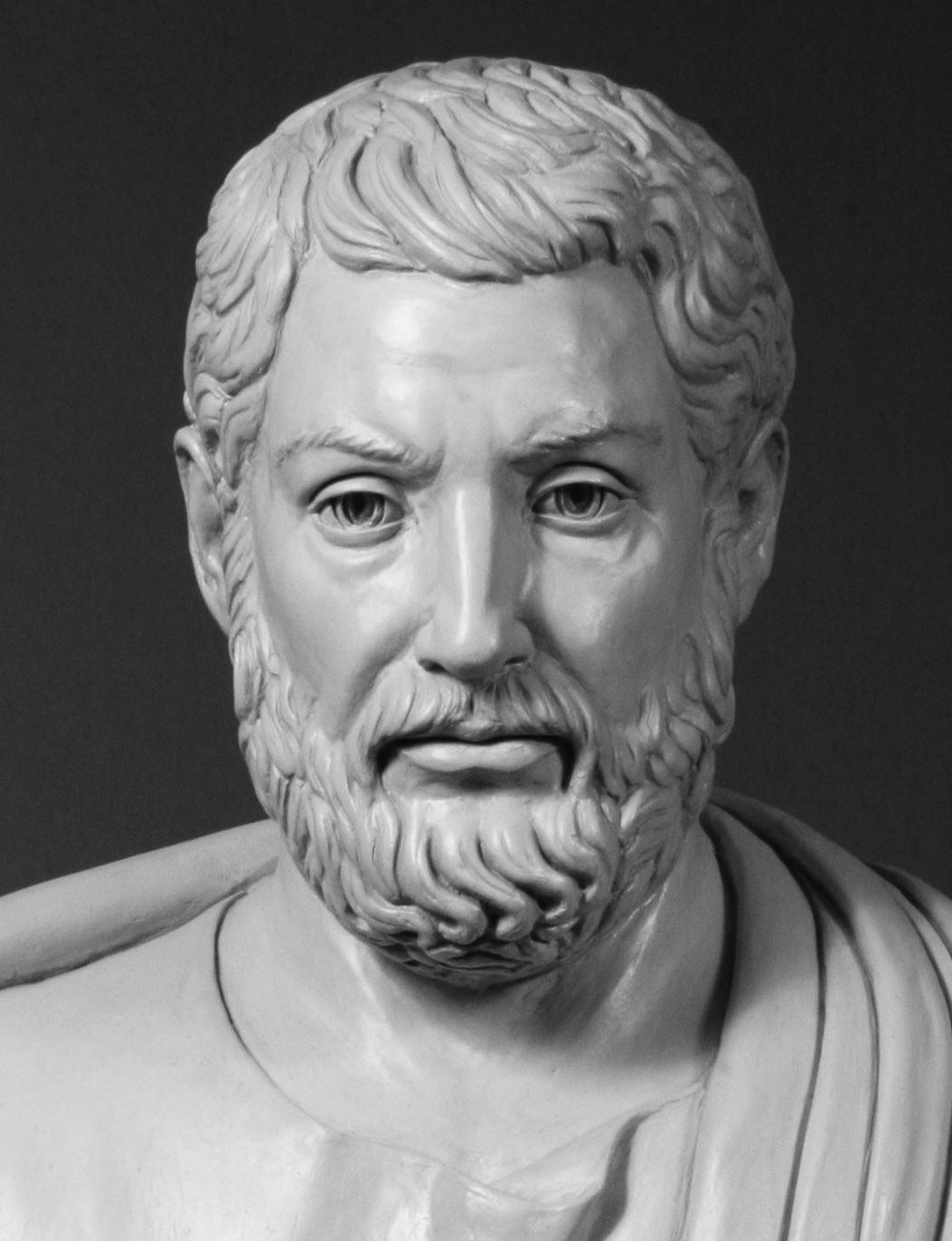
- Modern bust of Cleisthenes, known as "the father of Athenian democracy", on view at the Ohio Statehouse, Columbus, Ohio

Eponymous archon of Athens
- In office 525 – 524 BC
- Preceded by: Hippias
- Succeeded by: Miltiades

Personal details
- Born: c. 570 BC
- Died: c. 508 BC
- Relatives: Alcmaeonidae

Cleisthenes (/ˈklaɪsθɪniːz/ KLYS-thin-eez; Greek: Κλεισθένης), or Clisthenes (c. 570 – c. 508 BC), was an ancient Athenian lawgiver credited with reforming the constitution of ancient Athens and setting it on a democratic footing in 508 BC. For these accomplishments, historians refer to him as "the father of Athenian democracy". He was a member of the aristocratic Alcmaeonid clan. He was the younger son of Megacles and Agariste making him the maternal grandson of the tyrant Cleisthenes of Sicyon. He was also credited with increasing the power of the Athenian citizens' assembly and for reducing the power of the nobility over Athenian politics.

In 510 BC, Spartan hoplites helped the Athenians overthrow the tyrant Hippias, son of Peisistratus. Cleomenes I, king of Sparta, put in place a pro-Spartan oligarchy headed by Isagoras. However, Cleisthenes, with the support of the middle class and aided by democrats, took over. Cleomenes intervened in 508 and 506 BC, but could not stop Cleisthenes and his Athenian supporters. Through Cleisthenes' reforms, the people of Athens endowed their city with isonomic institutions—equal rights for all citizens (though only free men and women were citizens)—and established ostracism as a punishment.

== Biography ==
Historians estimate that Cleisthenes was born around 570 BC. A member of the Alcmaeonidae family, Cleisthenes was the uncle of Pericles' mother, Agariste, and of Alcibiades' maternal grandfather, Megacles. He was the son of Agariste and grandson of Cleisthenes of Sicyon. Unlike his grandfather who was a tyrant, he adopted politically democratic concepts. When Pisistratus took power in Athens as a tyrant, he exiled his political opponents and the Alcmaeonidae. After Pisistratus' death in 527 BC, Cleisthenes returned to Athens and became the eponymous archon. A few years later, Pisistratus' successors, Hipparchus and Hippias, again exiled Cleisthenes. In 514 BC, Harmodius and Aristogeiton assassinated Hipparchus, causing Hippias to further harden his attitude towards the people of Athens. This led Cleisthenes to ask the Oracle of Delphi to persuade the Spartans to help him free Athens from tyranny. Cleisthenes' plea for assistance was accepted by the Oracle as his family had previously helped rebuild the sanctuary when it was destroyed by fire.

=== Rise to power ===
With help from the Spartans and the Alcmaeonidae (Cleisthenes' genos, "clan"), he was responsible for overthrowing Hippias, the tyrant son of Pisistratus. After the collapse of Hippias' tyranny, Isagoras and Cleisthenes were rivals for power, but Isagoras won the upper hand by appealing to the Spartan king Cleomenes I to help him expel Cleisthenes. He did so on the pretext of the Alcmaeonid curse. Consequently, Cleisthenes left Athens as an exile, and Isagoras was unrivalled in power within the city. Isagoras set about dispossessing hundreds of Athenians of their homes and exiling them on the pretext that they too were cursed. He also attempted to dissolve the Boule (βουλή), a council of Athenian citizens appointed to run the daily affairs of the city. However, the council resisted, and the Athenian people declared their support of the council. Isagoras and his partisans were forced to flee to the Acropolis, remaining besieged there for two days. On the third day they fled the city and were banished. Cleisthenes was subsequently recalled, along with hundreds of exiles, and he assumed leadership of Athens. Promptly after his instatement as leader, he commissioned a bronze memorial from the sculptor Antenor in honour of the lovers and tyrannicides Harmodius and Aristogeiton, whom Hippias had executed.

=== Reformations and governance of Athens ===
==== Political reorganization ====
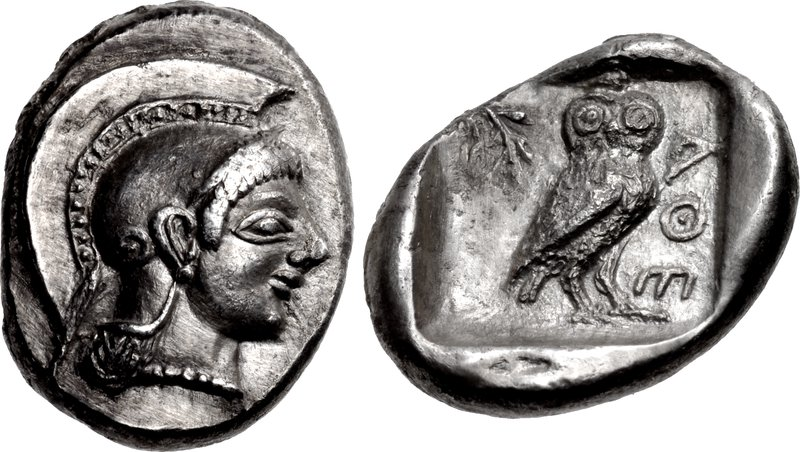
Coinage of Athens at the time of Cleisthenes. Effigy of Athena, with owl and ΑΘΕ, initials of "Athens". Circa 510–500/490 BC.

After this victory, Cleisthenes began to reform the government of Athens. In order to forestall strife between the traditional clans, which had led to the tyranny in the first place, he changed the political organization from the four traditional tribes, which were based on family relations, and which formed the basis of the upper-class Athenian political power network, into ten tribes according to their area of residence (their deme), which would form the basis of a new democratic power structure. It is thought that there may have been 139 demes (though this is still a matter of debate), each organized into three groups called trittyes ("thirds"), with ten demes divided among three regions in each trittyes (a city region, asty; a coastal region, paralia; and an inland region, mesogeia). D.M Lewis argues that Cleisthenes established the deme system in order to balance the central unifying force that a tyranny has with the democratic concept of having the people (instead of a single person) at the peak of political power. Another by-product of the deme system was that it split up and weakened his political adversaries. Cleisthenes also abolished patronymics in favour of demonymics (a name given according to the deme to which one belongs), thus increasing Athenians' sense of belonging to a deme. This and the other aforementioned reforms had an additional effect in that they worked to include (wealthy, male) foreign citizens in Athenian society.

He also established sortition – the random selection of citizens to fill government positions rather than kinship or heredity. It is also speculated that, in another move to lower the barriers of kinship and heredity when it comes to participation in Athenian society, Cleisthenes made it so foreign residents of Athens were eligible to become legally privileged. In addition, he reorganized the Boule, created with 400 members under Solon, so that it had 500 members, 50 from each tribe. He also introduced the bouleutic oath, "To advise according to the laws what was best for the people". The court system (Dikasteria – law courts) was reorganized and had from 201–5001 jurors selected each day, up to 500 from each tribe. It was the role of the Boule to propose laws to the assembly of voters, who convened in Athens around forty times a year for this purpose. The bills proposed could be rejected, passed, or returned for amendments by the assembly.

==== Introduction of ostracism ====
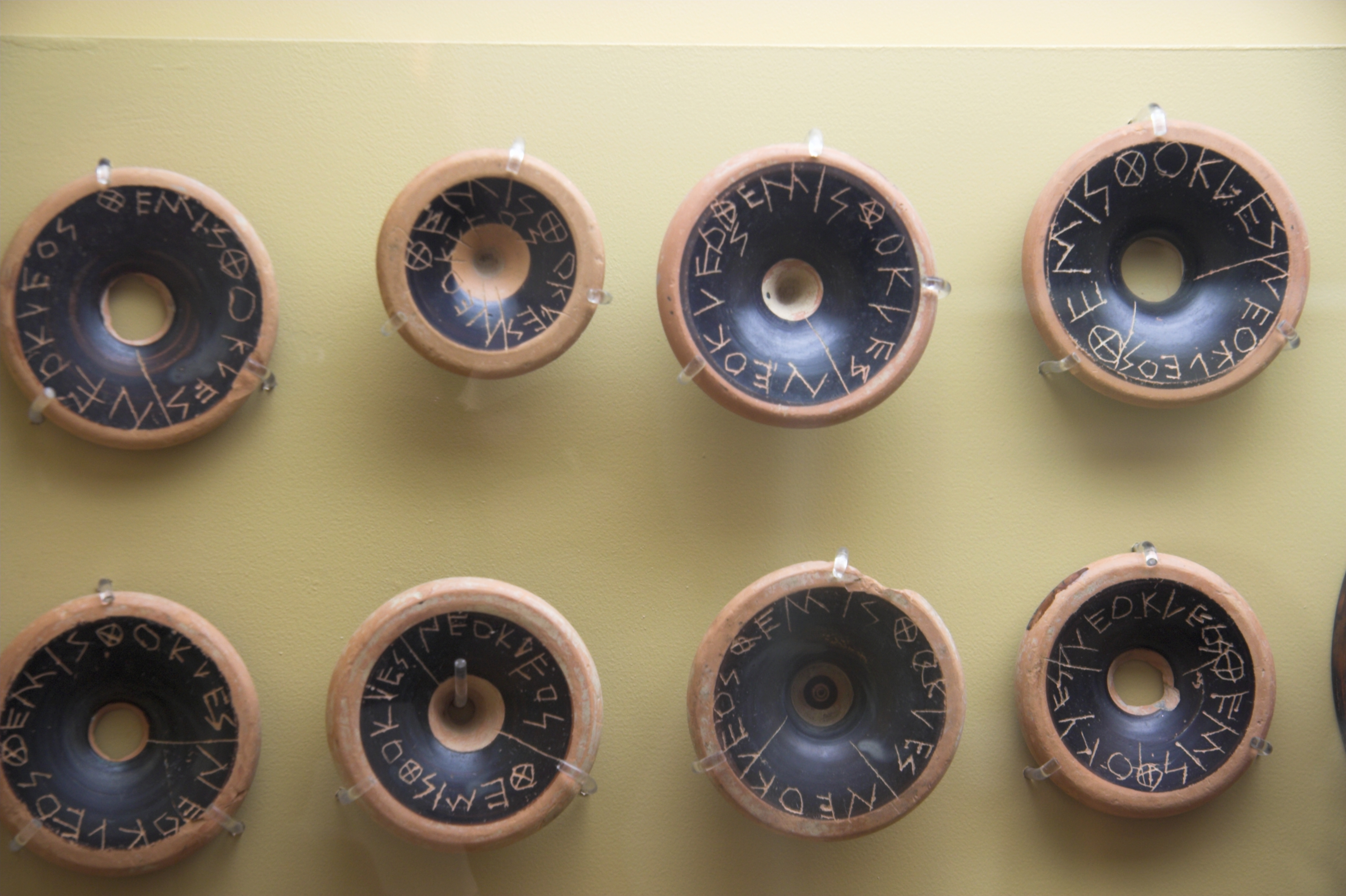
Most famously, Cleisthenes' ostracism was used against Themistocles in 472/471 BC. These were the particular ostraca used.

Cleisthenes also may have introduced ostracism (first used in 487 BC), whereby a vote by at least 6,000 citizens would exile a citizen for ten years. The initial and intended purpose was to vote for a citizen deemed to be a threat to the democracy, most likely anyone who seemed to have ambitions to set himself up as tyrant. However, soon after, any citizen judged to have too much power in the city tended to be targeted for exile (e.g., Xanthippus in 485–84 BC). Under this system, the exiled man's property was maintained, but he was not physically in the city where he could possibly create a new tyranny. One later ancient author records that Cleisthenes himself was the first person to be ostracized.

Cleisthenes called these reforms isonomia ("equality vis à vis law", iso- meaning equality; nomos meaning law), instead of demokratia. Cleisthenes' life after his reforms is unknown as no ancient texts mention him thereafter.

== Attempt to obtain Persian support ==
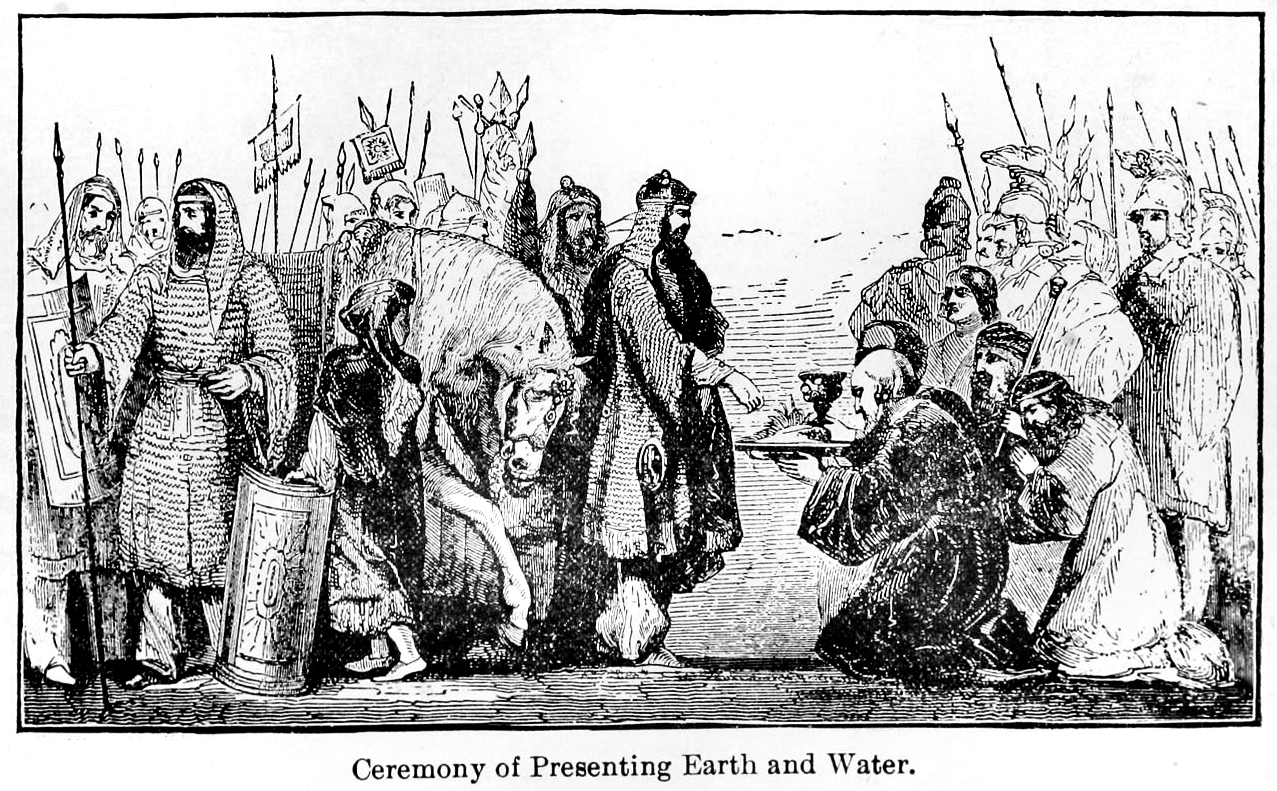
According to Herodotus, the Athenians made the gift of "Earth and Water to the Persians in 507 BC, at the time Cleisthenes was leading Athenian politics.

In 507 BC, during the time Cleisthenes was leading Athenian politics, and probably at his instigation, democratic Athens sent an embassy to Artaphernes, brother of Darius I, and Achaemenid Satrap, of Asia Minor in the capital of Sardis, looking for Persian assistance in order to resist the threats from Sparta. Herodotus reports that Artaphernes had no previous knowledge of the Athenians, and his initial reaction was "Who are these people?" Artaphernes asked the Athenians for "Water and Earth", a symbol of submission, if they wanted help from the Achaemenid king. The Athenian ambassadors apparently accepted to comply, and to give "Earth and Water". Artaphernes also advised the Athenians that they should receive back the Athenian tyrant Hippias. The Persians threatened to attack Athens if they did not accept Hippias. Nevertheless, the Athenians preferred to remain democratic despite the danger from the Achaemenid Empire, and the ambassadors were disavowed and censured upon their return to Athens.

After that, the Athenians sent to bring back Cleisthenes and the seven hundred households banished by Cleomenes; then they despatched envoys to Sardis, desiring to make an alliance with the Persians; for they knew that they had provoked the Lacedaemonians and Cleomenes to war. When the envoys came to Sardis and spoke as they had been bidden, Artaphrenes son of Hystaspes, viceroy of Sardis, asked them, "What men are you, and where dwell you, who desire alliance with the Persians?" Being informed by the envoys, he gave them an answer whereof the substance was, that if the Athenians gave king Darius earth and water, then he would make alliance with them; but if not, his command was that they should begone. The envoys consulted together and consented to give what was asked, in their desire to make the alliance. So they returned to their own country, and were then greatly blamed for what they had done.

— Herodotus 5.73.

There is a possibility that the Achaemenid ruler now saw the Athenians as subjects who had solemnly promised submission through the gift of "Earth and Water", and that subsequent actions by the Athenians, such as their intervention in the Ionian revolt, were perceived as a breach of oath and a rebellion against the central authority of the Achaemenid ruler.
