= Phyle =

Ancient Greek term for tribe or clan

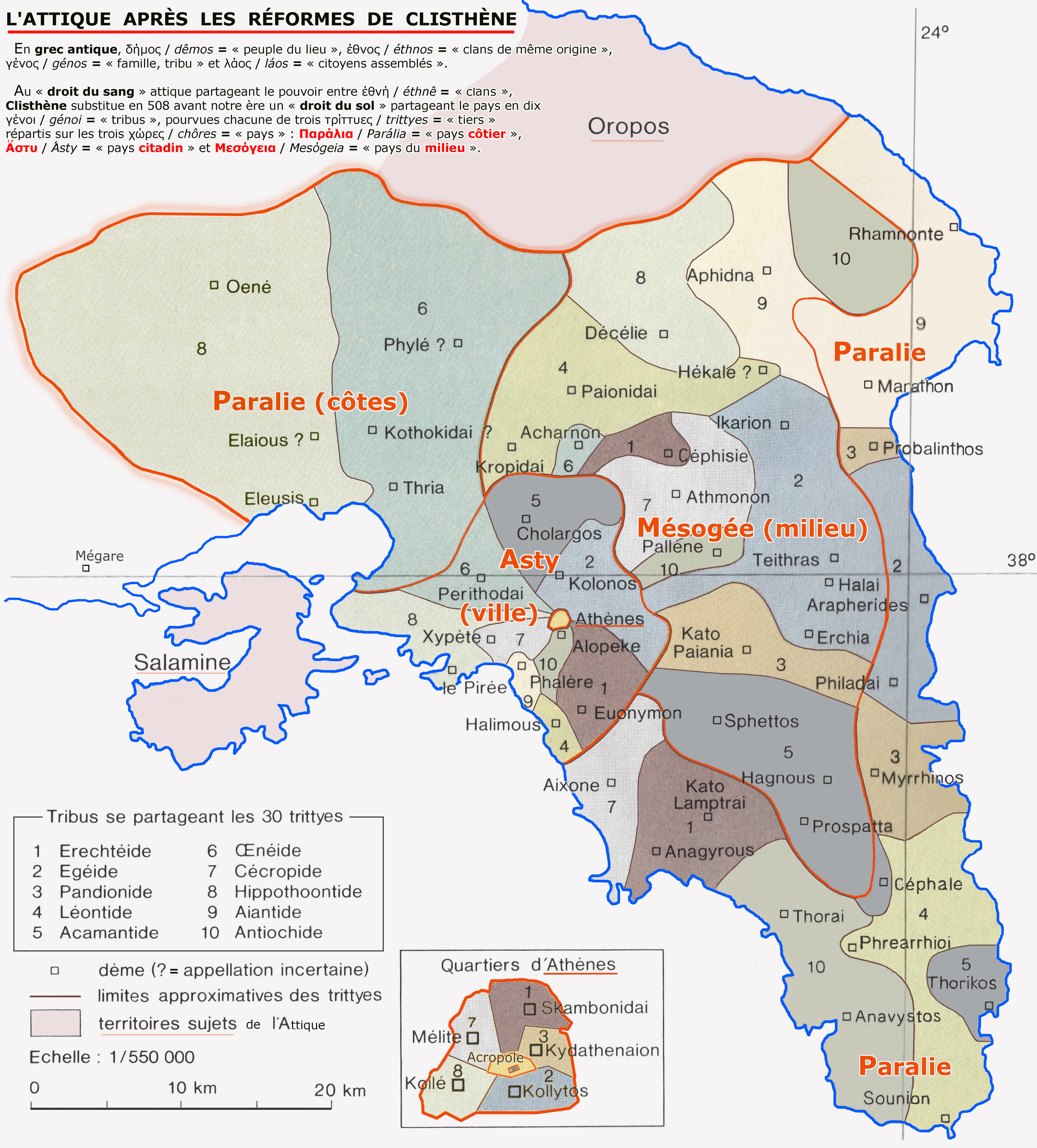
Attica after Cleisthenes' reforms with the ten "tribes", thirty "trittyes", and the demes.

Phyle (Greek: φυλή, romanized: phulē, lit. 'tribe, clan'; pl. phylai, φυλαί; derived from Greek φύεσθαι, phyesthai lit. 'to descend, to originate') is an ancient Greek term for tribe or clan. Members of the same phyle were known as symphyletai (Greek: συμφυλέται) meaning 'fellow tribesmen'. During the late 6th century BC, Cleisthenes organized the population of Athens in ten phylai (tribes), each consisting of three trittyes ("thirtieths"), with each trittys comprising a number of demes. Tribes and demes had their own officers and were self-administered. Some phylai can be classified by their geographic location, such as the Geleontes, the Argadeis, the Hopletes, and the Agikoreis in Ionia, as well as the Hylleans, the Pamphyles, the Dymanes in Doris.

== Attic tribes ==
=== First period ===
The best-attested new system was that created by Cleisthenes for Attica in or just after 508 BC. The landscape was regarded as comprising three zones: urban (asty), coastal (paralia) and inland (mesogeia). Each zone was split into ten sections called trittyes ('thirdings'), to each of which were assigned between one and ten of the 139 existing settlements, villages or town-quarters, which were henceforth called demoi.

Three sections, one each from urban, coastal and inland, were then put together to form a tribe. The 30 sections therefore yielded ten tribes, each named after a local hero and each with a geographically scattered membership roughly equal in size and hereditary in the male line thenceforward. They rapidly took on various functions.

They became the brigading units for the army; constituencies for the election of magistrates, especially the ten generals (strategoi), for the section of members of the Council of 500 (boule) and of the 6,000 jurors, and for the selection of boards of administrative officials of every kind: and bases for the selection of competing teams of runners, singers or dancers at various festivals. They had their own corporate life, with officials and sanctuaries, and came to have an official order:

1. Erechtheis (Ἐρεχθηΐς)

2. Aigeis (Αἰγηΐς)

3. Pandionis (Πανδιονίς)

4. Leontis (Λεοντίς)

5. Acamantis (Ἀκαμαντίς)

6. Oineis (Οἰνηΐς)

7. Kekropis (Κεκροπίς)

8. Hippothontis (Ἱπποθοντίς)

9. Aiantis (Αἰαντίς)

10. Antiochis (Ἀντιοχίς).

=== Subsequent periods ===
After this so called Period I that lasted until 307/306 BC, the system of Phylae had undergone few changes:

- in Period II (307/306 – 224/223 BC) two Macedonian Phylai were created (XI. Antigonis and XII. Demetrias);
- in Period III (224/223 – 201/200 BC) an Egyptian Phyle XIII. Ptolemais was created;
- in Period IV (201/200 BC – 126/127 AD) the Macedonian Phylae were dissolved and a Tribe XIV. Attalis, was created;
- in Period V (126/127 AD – third century) a tribe XV. Hadrianis was created.

== Ten tribes of Thurii ==
When the colony of Thurii on the Gulf of Taranto was settled under the support of Pericles and the command of Lampon and Xenocritus the population was organized in ten tribes, following the Athenian organization: there were tribes for the population of 1. Arcadia, 2. Achaea, 3. Elis, 4. Boeotia, 5. Delphi, 6. Dorians, 7. Ionians, 8. population of Euboea, 9. the islands and 10. Athenians.

== Sources ==
- Pritchard, David (2000). "Tribal Participation and Solidarity in Fifth-Century Athens: A Summary". Ancient History. 30 (2): 104–118.
- Traill, John S., The political organization of Attica: a study of the demes, trittyes, and phylai, and their representation in the Athenian Council, Princeton : American School of Classical Studies at Athens (ASCSA), 1975
- Macan, Reginald Walter (1895). Herodotus the Fourth, Fifth and Sixth Books with Introduction, Notes, Appendices, Indices, Maps. Vol. I. Macmillan and Company.
