= Hippoclus =

6th century BC tyrant of Lampsacus

Hippoclus (Ancient Greek: Ἳπποκλος) is a tyrant of Lampsacus and the son of Aeantides. Hippias gave his daughter Archedice into marriage by consideration of Thucydides's influence at the Persian court.

He is the same as the tyrant of Lampsacus in the list of those who were left at the passage of the Danube, specifically during the Scythian expedition of Darius I.
