= Two-handled amphora (Boston 63.1515) =

Ancient Greek vase (c. 510 BCE)

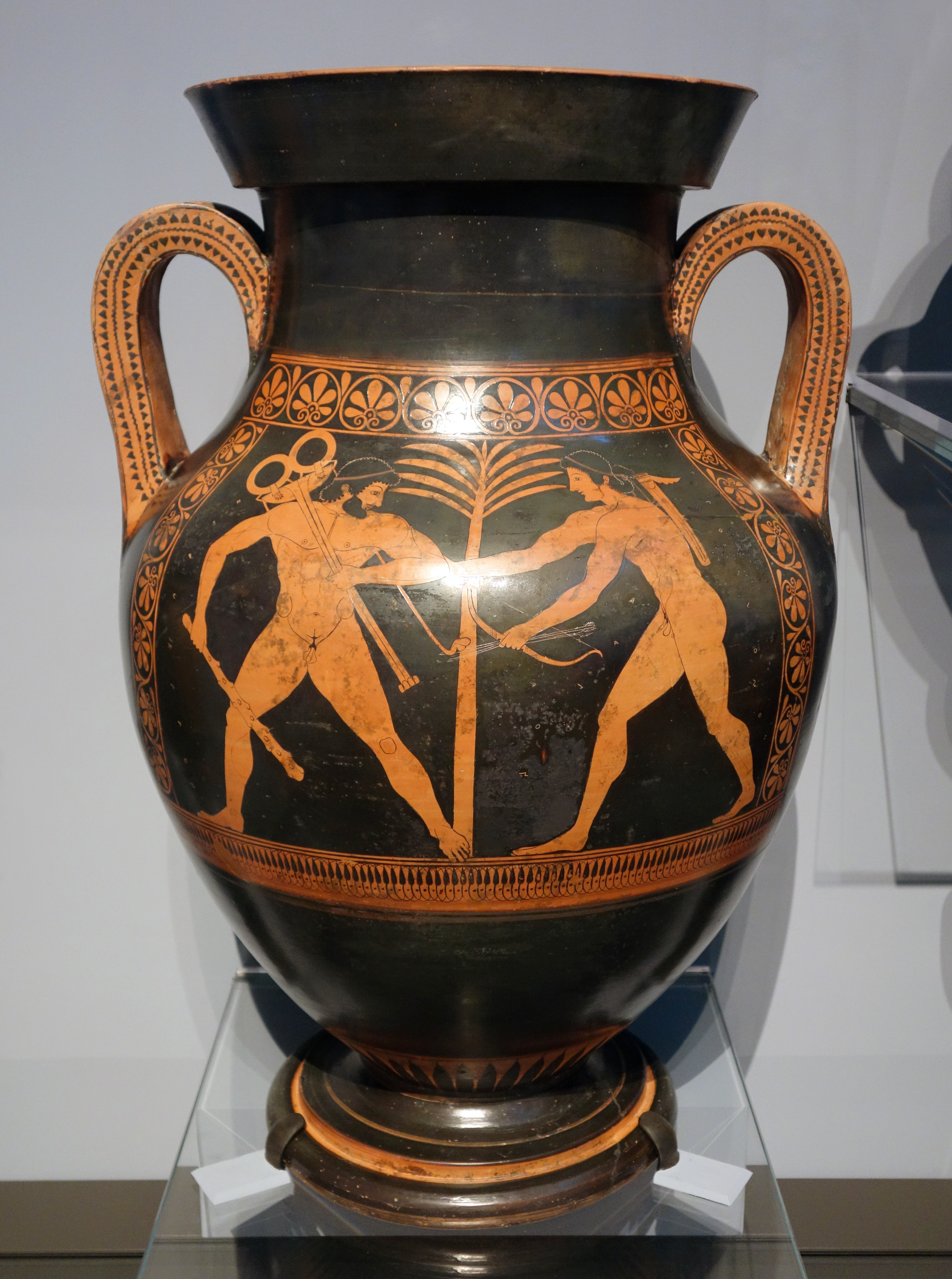
Amphora of the Pioneer Group, circle of Euthymides (Museum of Fine Arts, Boston)

This two-sided, red figure belly amphora is housed in the Classics wing of the Museum of Fine Arts, Boston. It was bought during Art Basel from Münzen und Medaillen, A.G., October 17, 1963. With flat handles decorated with depictions of ivy, and a double layered foot, it qualifies as a type A amphora. Dated circa 510 BCE, it was likely created by a member of the circle of Euthymides in Athens. It is an early example of red-figure pottery which had been invented only ten years previously. It is regarded by scholars as one of the best examples of the vases that influenced artists in Etruria. It is in excellent condition, but lacks an original find-spot.

== Depictions ==
This vase consists of two scenes on either side of the vase, separated by a floral border.

Side A shows the tussle between Apollo and Herakles over the Delphic Tripod, a common subject in painted vases. These bronze tripods were used for sacrifices, and were a very common votive offering at Archaic Greek temples; large numbers have been found at Apollo's important cult site of Delphi, where this legend is set. Herakles is attempting to steal the particular sacred tripod of Delphi after the Pythian oracle refused to tell Herakles how to cure himself of a disease. Apollo attempts to stop Herakles and an argument between the two half-brothers devolves into a wrestling contest. This fight is eventually broken up when the two are separated by one of Zeus’ lightning bolts.

Side A depicts the moment when Apollo first grabs Herakles’ bicep to stop him from absconding with the tripod. With an open mouth, he seems to beseech Herakles to reconsider his actions. Herakles wrenches his arm from Apollo, shifting his weight from one foot to the other. The sacred palm in the middle of the frame serves as a barrier between the two figures and as a marker of the sacred site of Delphi. The words HERAKLEOS, KALOS, and APOLLONOS which mean Herakles, Beautiful, and Apollo respectively.

Professor Warren G. Moon has noted that the depiction of Herakles silhouette and movement bear similarities to depictions by the Rycroft Painter on black-figure pottery work.

Side B shows a common motif among Archaic pottery: a scuffle between a maenad and a group of satyrs. The ithyphallic satyrs defend themselves from the blows of the maenad's grape vines as they advance upon her. This composition of this side, with three figures evenly spaced, with varied and expressive poses, is a type adapted by Etruscan artists in their tomb paintings, as well as vases made in Etruria.
