= Charmus =

Athenian polemarch during the Pisistratid dynasty

Charmus of Kolyttus (Ancient Greek: Χάρμος; fl. mid-6th century BCE) was an Athenian polemarch (557/6) during the Pisistratid dynasty, and also eromenos of Pisistratus.

He is known for being the father of Hipparchus of the deme Cholargos, archon of 496/5, who was the first Athenian to be ostracized in 487 according to a law passed by Cleisthenes especially to banish him. The motive for Cleisthenes' actions was that Hipparchus (not to be confused with Hipparchus, son of Pisistratus) was the leader and representative of the friends of the tyrants, and was working for the return of Charmus' son-in-law (and Hipparchus' brother-in-law), Hippias, the other son of Pisistratus exiled in 511/10, and for the appeasement of the Persians. Pisistratus had given the "extraordinarily beautiful" daughter of Charmus in marriage to his eldest son Hippias, who succeeded him in the tyranny, uniting the two former lovers into one family.

Charmus dedicated a statue of Eros in the Academy of Athens, where the runners in the sacred torch night race light their torches on the altar of Prometheus in its grove, and he was the first Athenian to dedicate an altar to the god of love, on which there is the following inscription: "O wily Eros, Charmus this altar raised at the well-shaded bounds of the Gymnasium."
