= Archedice =

Daughter of Hippias, the 6th-century BC tyrant of Athens

Archedice (Ancient Greek: Ἀρχεδίκη), daughter of Hippias the Peisistratid, and given in marriage by him after the death of Hipparchus to Aeantides, son of Hippoclus, the tyrant of Lampsacus.

Archedice is famous for the epitaph given in Thucydides, and ascribed by Aristotle to Simonides, which told that, with father, husband, and sons in sovereign power, still she retained her meekness.
