= Phye =

6th-century BCE Attic Greek woman employed to impersonate Athena

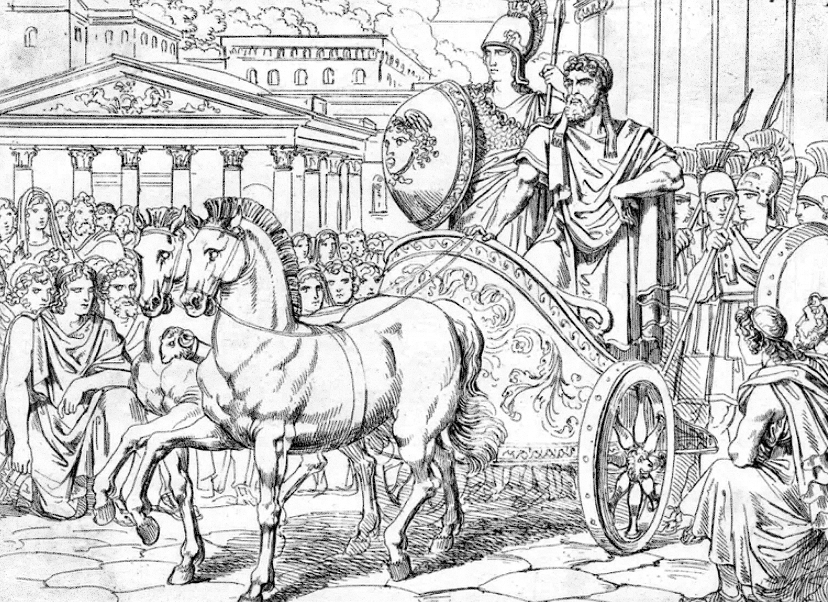
Illustration of Pisistratus and Phye as Athena upon arrival at Athens. Barth, 1832.

Phye (Greek: Φύη, romanized: Phýē) was a young woman from Paeania who accompanied the tyrant Pisistratus in a chariot during his return to Athens in 546/5 BCE. Phye was dressed as the goddess Athena in order to deceive the people of Athens into believing that Peisistratos' return to Athens was divinely sanctioned.

== Historical context ==
Around 555 BCE, the tyrant Pisistratus was exiled from the city of Athens. During this exile, he formed an alliance with Megakles, and together they devised a plan to reinstate Pisistratus as tyrant of Athens. In 546/5 BCE, Peisistratos recruited Phye, a beautiful young woman from either the ancient deme of Paeania or that of Kollytos, to accompany him as he proceeded from Brauron to Mount Hymettus, through Marathon, and finally to Athens where they entered via the eastern gate of the city. The chariot in which Phye stood was preceded by heralds who announced that Athena was bringing Pisistratus back to Athens. Seltman paints a vivid – although not historically supported – image of their arrival, complete with the invention that the party (which was expected by the Megakles) arrived later than the appointed hour, and he suggests that Pisistratus was hailed as a "New Erechtheus", a reincarnation of the legendary king and founder of Athens. Lavelle claims that Megakles himself was the architect of this scheme and the mastermind behind the entire hoax.

The name Phye itself derives from the noun φυή (from the verb φύω), which can be translated variously as good growth or stature, or the flower or prime of age; it is fitting that a tall, beautiful, young woman should be named thus.

== Sources ==
=== Herodotus ===
The earliest version of the story of Phye is found in Herodotus' Histories (1.60.4-5), which date to the 440s BCE. In the passages of relevance, Herodotus described Phye as nearly 6 feet tall and beautiful (εὐειδής), decked out in full armour and everything else needed to impress and convince the people of Athens. According to Herodotus, heralds arrived in the city prior to Pisistratus and Phye, announcing that Athena honoured Pisistratus above all other men and was escorting him back to her Acropolis personally. In his account, the Athenians are duped by this trick, and they both welcome Pisistratus back to the city and worship the human Phye as a goddess. Before telling the story, Herodotus inserts his own opinions of the event, specifically his astonishment that the Athenians – the most clever of all the Greeks – should be fooled by such a silly plan (Herodotus 1.60.3).

The translations of Phye's situation in the chariot differ, and present a range of imagery. For example, Ferrari translates "...and placed her in a chariot in a pose that would make the best display", whereas Godley's text reads "and put in a chariot, giving her all the paraphernalia to make the most impressive spectacle". Whether the convincing accoutrements are objects or a gesture are unclear from the Greek word (σχῆμα).

=== Aristotle ===
The story of Phye is also found in Aristotle's Athenian Constitution (14.4), written sometime in the 3rd quarter of the 4th century BCE. Aristotle's version echoes many of Herodotus' details, including: that the Phye/Athena plan had been devised in conjunction with Megakles, that she was tall and beautiful, that rumours circulated saying that Pisistratus would be reinstated by the goddess herself, and that she accompanied Pisistratus into the city and was received amid cheers. Aristotle differs in one point from Herodotus, claiming instead that Phye was a Thracian from the deme of Kollytus rather than from Paeania.

=== Klei(to)demos ===
A version of the Phye narrative by the 4th century BCE historian Klei(to)demos is preserved in the 2nd century CE work Deipnosophists by Athenaeus. Klei(to)demos provides more details about Phye herself, beyond her physical beauty and striking similarity to the goddess Athena. Klei(to)demos credits Phye with restoring the Peisistratean tyranny, and then adds that she was a flower seller, the daughter of a man named Sokrates, and that Peisistratos gave Phye to his son Hipparchos in marriage. This source provides the sole evidence that Phye was Peistratus' daughter-in-law. Rhodes suggests that the addition of her father's name indicates that Phye was, in fact, a citizen of Athens.

== Credibility ==
The ancient authors present the story of Phye as a historical event, and Herodotus himself seems to have believed it. Scholars including Grote, Curtius, Busolt, and Connor accept the veracity of the narrative, whereas Stein, Beloch, and later Meyer instead believe the story was a ‘poetic variation of the historic tradition of the victory at Pallene’ (Herodotus 1.62.3ff); these latter scholars believe that it evolved from a historical victory at the temple of Athena at Pallene that transformed within two generations into a legendary story involving Phye. Against this theory, How and Wells argue that it takes "...almost greater credulity to suppose that history and myth could become thus inextricably mixed in the course of two generations than to accept the story of Phya". Lavelle, echoing Block, accepts the authenticity of the Phye incident based on its unique nature, Herodotus' accounts, and the plausibility of the story itself; the same author stresses that the Athenians did not believe that Phye actually was Athena, but that they accepted what she ('Athena') and Peisistratos himself represented together for the city of Athens. The connection between Peisistratos, the citizens of Athens, and their patron goddess is strengthened in this episode.

== Iconography ==
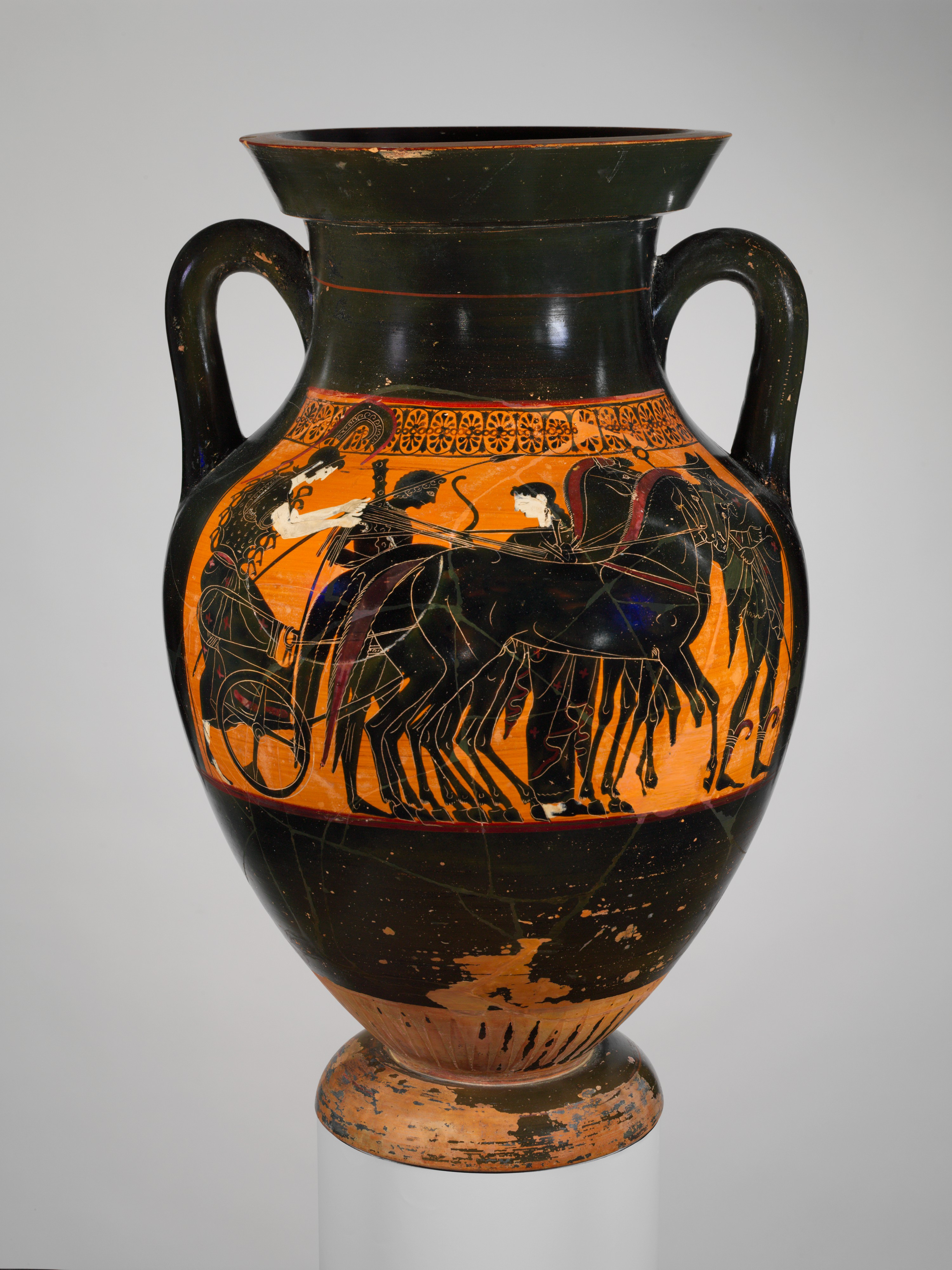
Amphora depicting Athena mounting chariot with Herakles and other gods, c. 520 BCE.

Approximately 170 ancient Greek vases (and at least one relief sculpted on a marble base), dating from the 560s through the 480s BCE, boast imagery of Herakles and Athena in a chariot, a scene commonly described as representing the apotheosis of Herakles. Boardman originally argued that these scenes departed from typical Heraklean apotheosis scenes (with Herakles and Athena on foot) because of a conscious desire to evoke the story of Pisistratus and Phye. In later works, Boardman rephrased his interpretation of these scenes, and said that they served as a point of reference for the historical Phye episode: "...familiarity with such scenes would have guaranteed the ordinary Athenian's recognition of what was implied by the procession." Ferrari, following Osborne and Connor, acknowledges the similarities between the iconography of Herakles/Peisistraots and Athena/Phye, but argues that it was Peisistratos who was intentionally evoking Herakles in his decision to appear with 'Athena' in a chariot upon entering the city.

One vase in particular by the Priam Painter offers further evidence for the link between the iconography of Herakles & Athena and the historical event of Pisistratus & Phye. On a belly amphora currently in the Ashmolean Museum (Oxford 212), a typical scene of Herakles and Athena is accompanied by the inscription "Ηρακλἐους κὀρη (Herakleous Kore)". Boardman, like Beazley before him, reads this as 'Herakles' daughter' rather than Herakles' girl, and connects the mythological to the historical in that Phye (Athena) was the daughter (in law) of Pisistratus (Herakles). Ferrari believes these words are the beginning of a metrical hymn and connects the mythological scene and historical event to the larger theme of the Panathenaic festival.
