= Philaidae (deme) =

Coordinates: 37°55′44″N 23°59′22″E

Philaidae or Philaidai (Ancient Greek: Φιλαΐδαι) was a deme of ancient Attica, which appears to have been near Brauron, since it is said to have derived its name from Philaeus, the son of the Telamonian Ajax, who dwelt in Brauron. Philaïdae was the deme of Peisistratus.

Its site is located about 0.25 miles (0.40 km) west of the basilica at Brauron.
