= Rhaecelus =

Coordinates: 40°28′16″N 22°51′15″E

Rhaecelus or Rhaikelos (Greek: Ῥαίκηλος and Ῥάκηλος) was an Eretrian colony in Lower Macedonia, near Aeneia, founded by Athenian tyrant Peisistratos of the 6th century BC. Its site is located near Aeneia.
