= Hippias (tyrant) =

Tyrant of Athens from 527 to 510 BC

- Ἱππίας
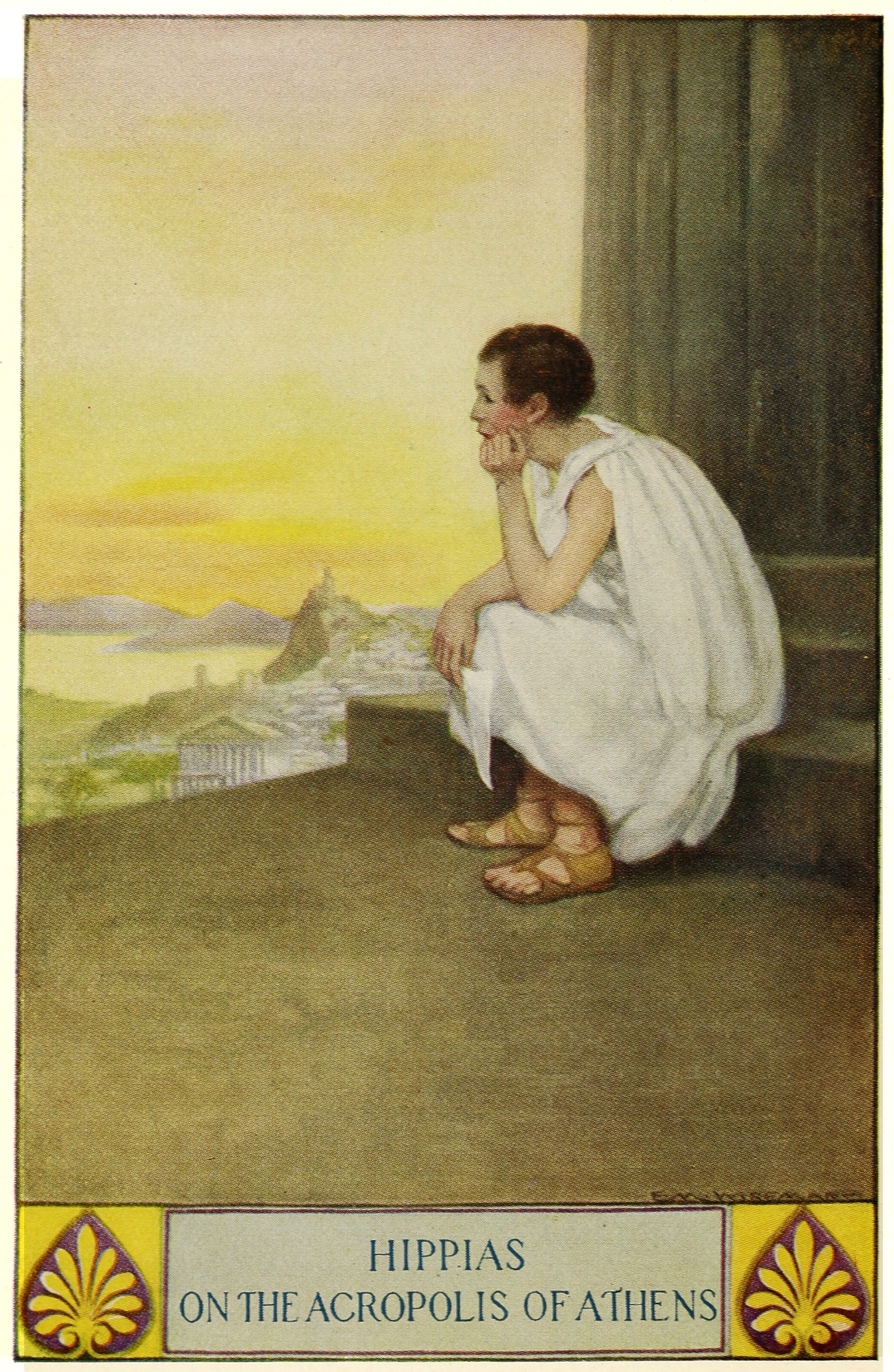

Tyrant of Athens
- In office 527–510 BC
- Preceded by: Peisistratus

Personal details
- Born: c. 570 BC Athens
- Died: 490 BC (aged c. 80) Lemnos
- Relations: Hipparchus (brother)
- Children: Archedice and 4 others
- Parent: Pisistratus

Military service
- Allegiance: Achaemenid Empire
- Years of service: 490 BC
- Battles/wars: First Persian invasion of Greece: Battle of Marathon

Hippias (Ancient Greek: Ἱππίας, romanized: Hippías; c. 570 BC – 490 BC) was the last tyrant of Athens, ruling from 527 to 510 BC. He was one of the Peisistratids, a group of tyrants from the same family in ancient Greece. His father was Pisistratus, who preceded him as ruler of Athens, while his brother Hipparchus may have ruled jointly with him. Hippias also had an illegitimate son, Hegesistratus, whom he made tyrant of Sigeion. He was deposed when Cleomenes I of Sparta successfully invaded Athens and forced him to flee to the Achaemenid Empire.

== Early life ==
Hippias was born around 570 BC as the eldest son of Pisistratus, the first tyrant of Athens. When his father was forced to flee to Eretria after insulting Megakles by having intercourse with his daughter in an indecent way, Peisistratos held counsel with his sons. Hippias suggested that they should retake the tyranny, which his father agreed to. Preparations began for which Athens fell to Peisistratos for the third time in 546 BC.

== Tyrant of Athens ==
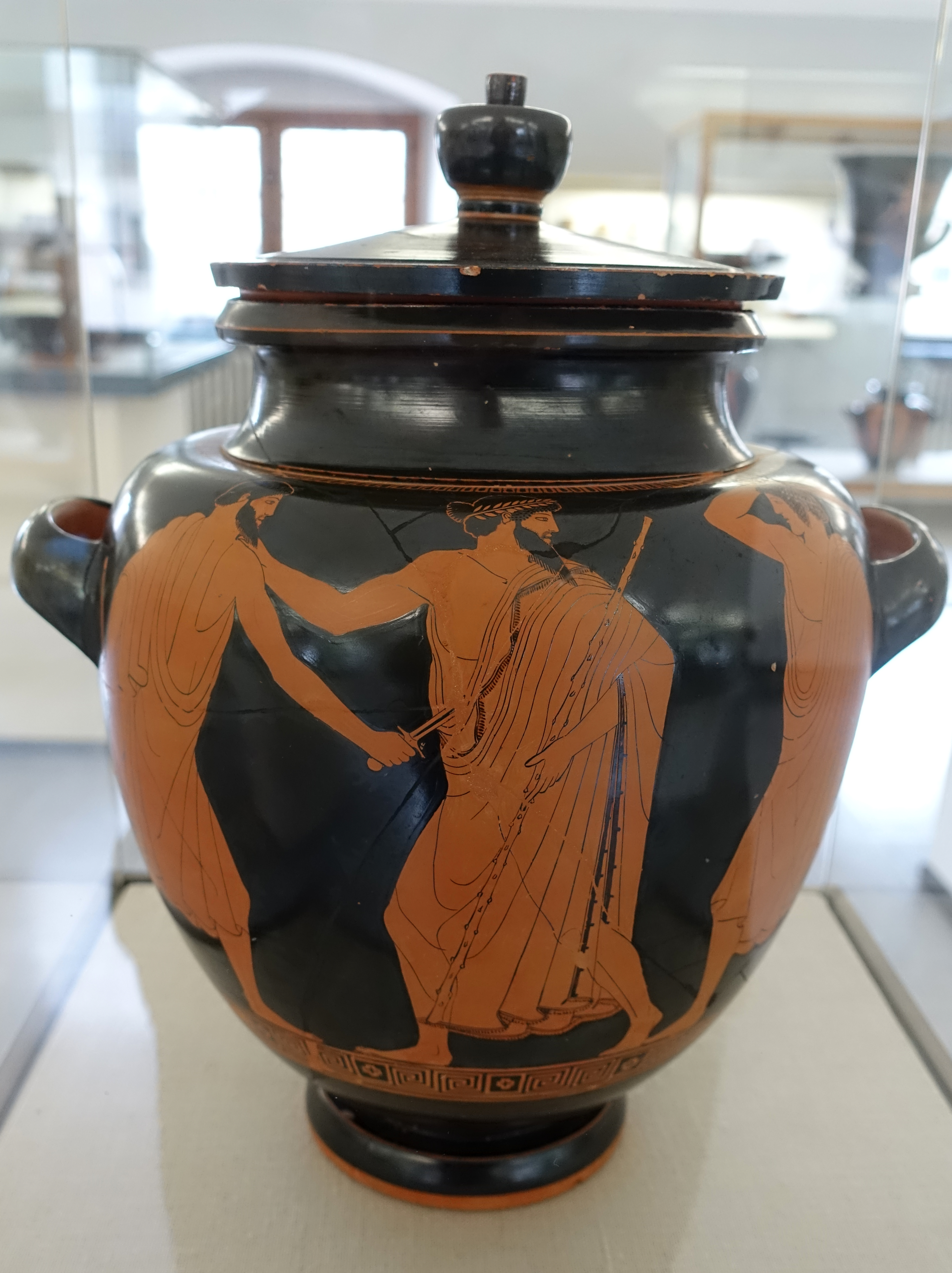
Death of the tyrant Hipparchus, by the Syriskos Painter, 475-470 BC

Hippias succeeded Peisistratos as tyrant of Athens in 528/7 BC when his father died of advanced age.

Hippias was greatly supported by the family of the polemarch Charmus, his father's former eromenos and ally, in the restoration of tyranny in Athens, and Pisistratus gave him in marriage the "extraordinarily beautiful" daughter of Charmus. Hippias was a patron of poets and craftsmen and under his rule Athens experienced a time of prosperity.

His brother Hipparchus, who may have ruled jointly with him, was murdered by Harmodius and Aristogeiton (the tyrannicides) in 514 BC during the Panathenaic festival. Aristogeiton was resentful at the advances made by Hipparchus toward Harmodius and with a small group of accomplices he had planned to kill both Hipparchus and his brother. When the plot failed and only Hipparchus was slain, the group was captured by Hippias' soldiers. The tyrant had Aristogeiton executed after torture while Harmodius was killed on the spot. It was said that Hippias thereafter became a bitter and cruel ruler over the next four years contrary to his father who was seen as moderate in his exercise of power. Hippias began executing a large number of citizens, exiling others, and imposing harsh taxes. His cruelty soon created unrest among his subjects and the Alkmeonid clan, who had previously ruled in Athens, along with other exiles attempted to free Athens from Hippias by force. As he began losing control, he sought military support from the Persians. He managed to form an alliance by marrying his daughter, Archedice, to Aiantides, son of Hippoklos, the tyrant of Lampsakos. This relationship with Hippoklos helped facilitate Hippias' access to Darius' court at Susa.

The Alcmaeonidae family of Athens, which Peisistratus had exiled in 546 BC, was concerned about Hippias forming alliances with the Persian ruling class, and began planning an invasion to depose him. Cleisthenes, an Alcmaeonidian who had served as archon in 525/4 BC before being exiled, bribed the Pythian priestess of Delphi to tell the Spartans that they should help liberate the Athenians. After a failed expedition, Cleomenes I of Sparta successfully invaded Athens in 510 BC and trapped Hippias on the Acropolis. They also took the Pisistratidae children hostage and forced Hippias to leave Athens in order to have them returned safely. Power of the city was then handed over to the Athenian magistrates thus beginning the Athenian democracy. The deposed tyrant was granted safe passage to Sigeion, from which he made the journey to Lampsakos and then to King Darius in Persia where he stayed at court.

== Attempts to reclaim the tyranny and death ==
The Spartans later concluded that a free and democratic Athens would be dangerous to Spartan power and that it would be weaker and easier to control if under a tyranny. The Spartans then attempted to recall Hippias from Persia and re-establish the tyranny. Hippias arrived, but was soon forced into exile once more when the Corinthians and the other Spartan allies declared that they did not think a tyranny should be imposed upon any of the Greek cities. As Hippias made his way back, he was offered the cities of Anthemous and Iolkos but he refused them and made for Sigeion instead at the entrance to the Hellespont. There he made his illegitimate son, Hegesistratus, tyrant of Sigeion. Hippias returned to Asia, where he railed against the Athenians to Artaphrenes, the governor of Sardis. The Athenians discovered Hippias' intentions, however, and sent a letter to Sardis to dissuade the Persians from listening to Athenian exiles but the Persians threatened to attack Athens if they did not accept Hippias' return. Nevertheless, the Athenians preferred to remain democratic despite the danger from Persia and refused to comply.

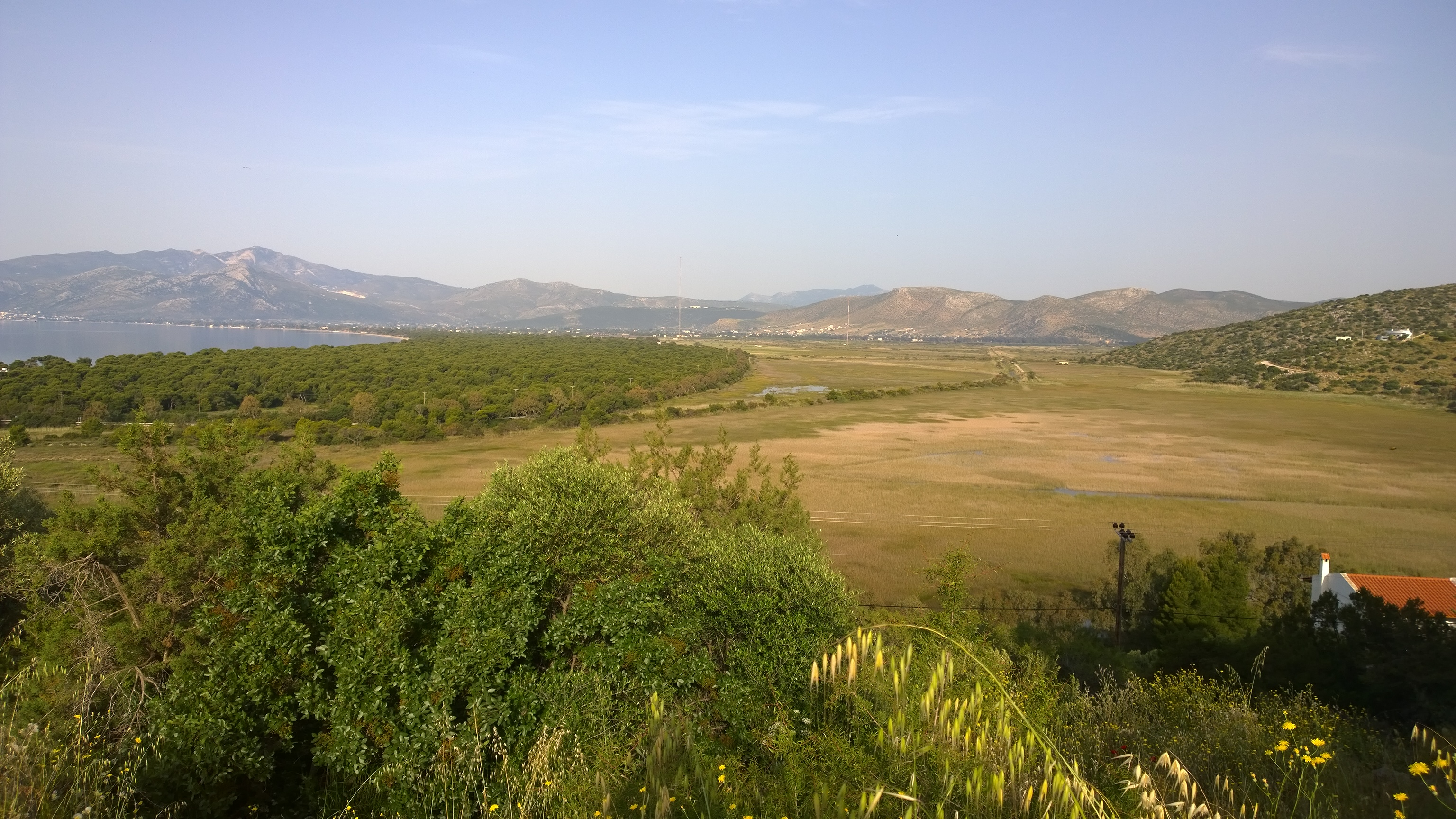
The plain of Marathon

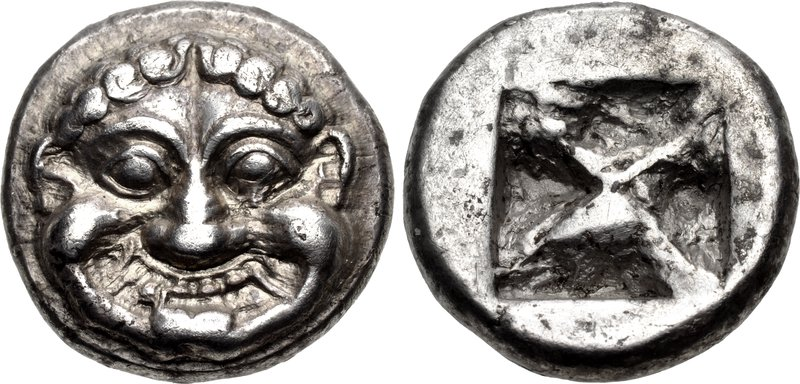
Coinage of Athens at the time of Hippias. Obv: An archaic Gorgoneion. Rev: Square incuse. 545–525 BC

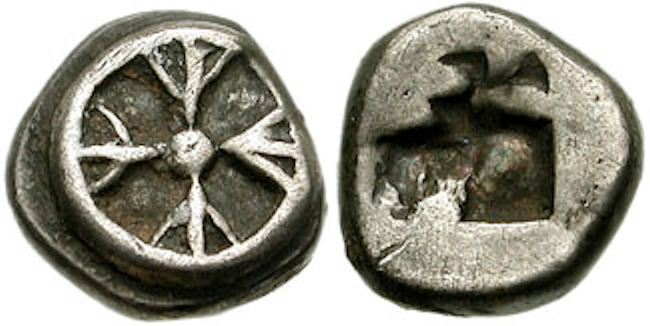
Coinage of Athens at the time of Hippias. Four-spoked wheel / Incuse square, divided diagonally. Circa 545-510 BC

Soon after this, the Ionian Revolt began. It was put down in 494 BC, but Darius I of Persia was intent on punishing Athens for its role in the revolt. In 490 BC Hippias, still in the service of the Persians, encouraged Darius to invade Greece and attack Athens; when Darius initiated the campaign, Hippias himself accompanied the Persian fleet and suggested Marathon as the place where the Persian invasion of Attica should begin as it was the most suitable for their cavalry. According to Herodotus, the night before the Persian fleet reached Attica, Hippias dreamt that he had sexual relations with his own mother, a dream which encouraged him greatly, since he took it as an omen that he would regain possession of his native land and die old there. But when he set foot on Greek soil, one of his teeth, which was loose due to his advanced age, fell out on to the beach after Hippias fell into a coughing and sneezing fit when directing the troops. Although he searched frantically for the tooth, he was not able to retrieve it. He believed that this fulfilled the real meaning of his dream: he would only regain this bite of his native country for his lost tooth held his share. Many Athenians were persuaded to join the battle when reminded that defeat under the Persians would lead to the re-installment of Hippias as tyrant.

Hippias is said to have died on the return journey from the Battle of Marathon, at Lemnos.

== Legacy ==
Hippias had five sons by Myrrhine, the daughter of Callias son of Hyperechides. One of these, Peisistratus, named after his grandfather, was one of the family members who held the archonship in Athens. All of his sons along with other Peisistratids joined the invading Persian army of Xerxes in 480 BC. Never again would the Peisistratids have influence in Athens.

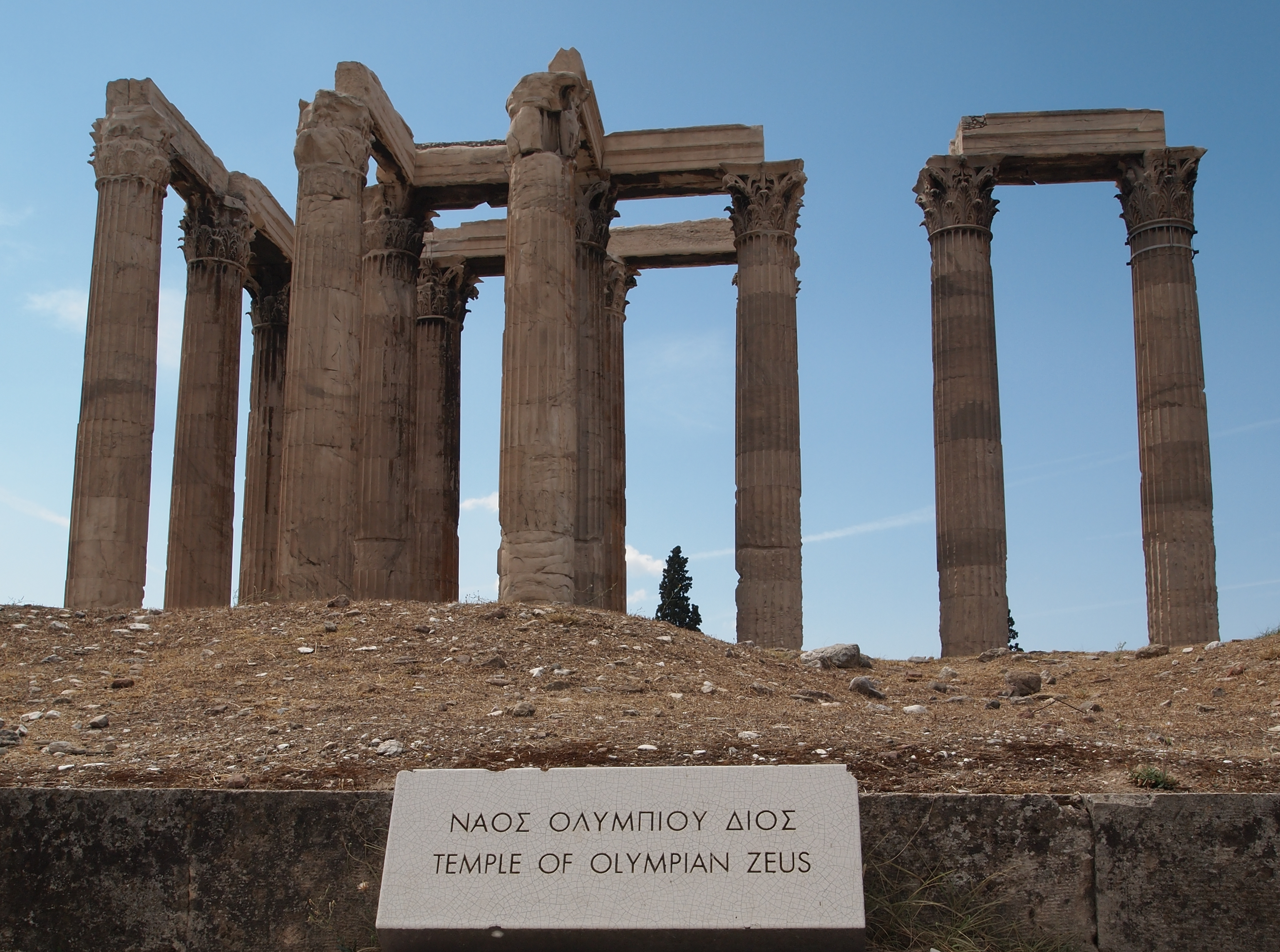
The Temple of Olympian Zeus

Construction of the temple of Olympian Zeus, which Peisistratus began in the sixth century BC, continued under Hippias' reign. Building was halted, however, amidst the political turmoil that followed Hippias' exile and the temple was not completed until the time of Hadrian in 125 AD. Along with Zeus's temple, the west side of the agora was remodeled. Hippias also took some interest in the Acropolis. The temple of Athena Polias was also renovated with propylaea added to the structure. A temple was further dedicated to the god Dionysus just to the south. There were other building projects known from Eleusis, Piraeus, and Thorikos as well.

Hippias was one of several Greek aristocrats who took refuge in the Achaemenid Empire following reversals at home, other famous ones being Themistocles, Demaratos, Gongylos, and Alcibiades. In general, these Greek aristocrats were generously welcomed by the Achaemenid kings, received land grants to support them, and ruled in various cities of Asia Minor.

| Preceded by Peisistratus | Tyrant of Athens; 527–510 BC | None |
