= Chilon of Sparta =

6th century BC Spartan philosopher, ephor and writer

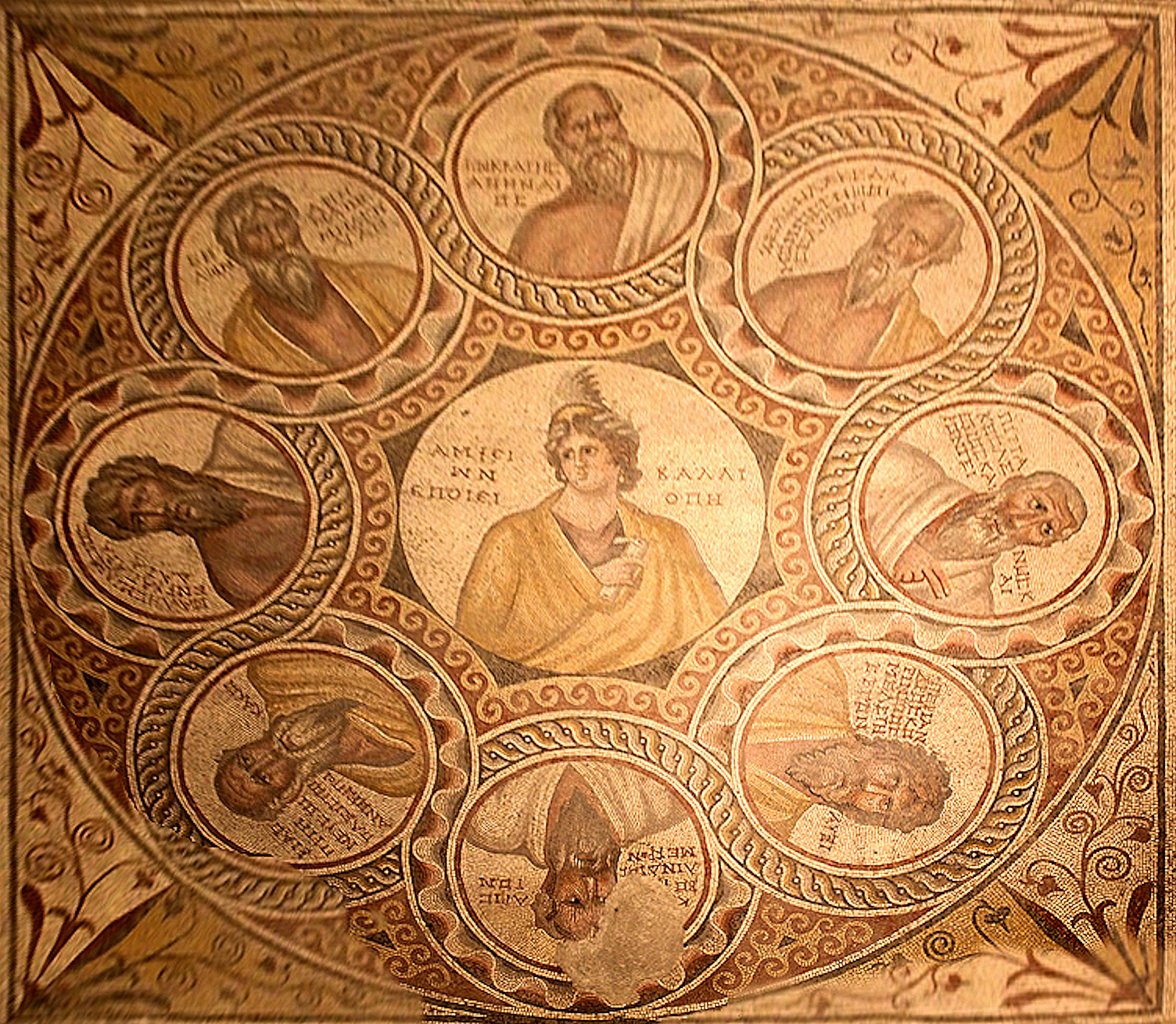
Chilon (top right) on a 3rd century AD Roman mosaic depicting the Seven Sages, now in the National Museum of Beirut.

Chilon of Sparta (Ancient Greek: Χείλων; fl. 6th century BC) was a Spartan politician credited with the militarization of Spartan society, and one of the Seven Sages of Greece.

== Life ==
Chilon was the son of Damagetus, and lived towards the beginning of the 6th century BC. Herodotus speaks of him as contemporary with Hippocrates, the father of Peisistratus. Diogenes Laërtius states that he was an old man in the 52nd Olympiad (572 BC), and that he was elected an ephor (overseer) in Sparta in the 56th Olympiad (556/5 BC). Alcidamas states that he was a member of the Spartan assembly. Diogenes Laërtius even goes so far as to claim that Chilon was also the first person who introduced the custom of joining the ephors to the kings as their counselors.

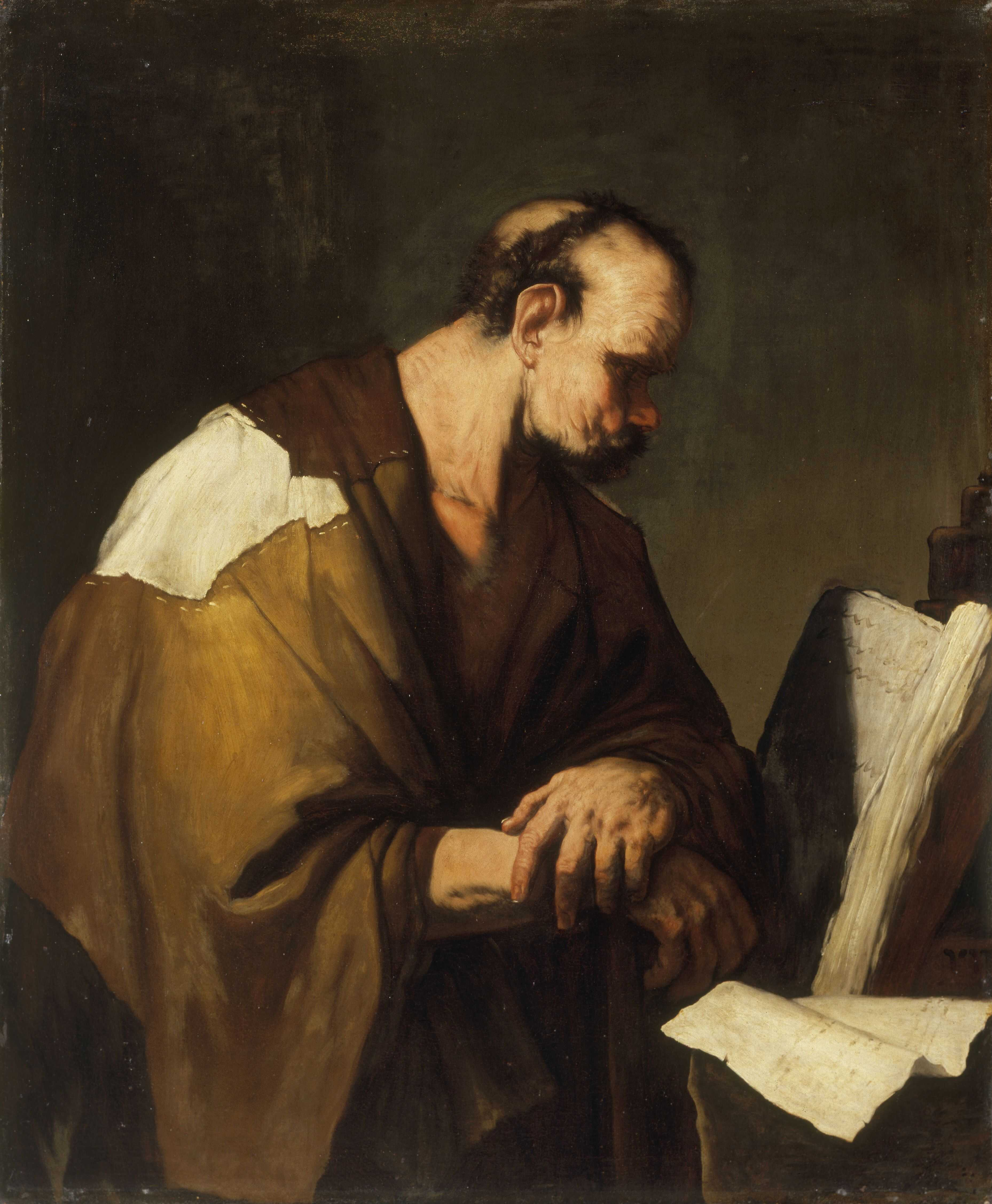
Fictional portrait of Chilon by Luca Giordano (ca. 1660)

Chilon is said to have helped to overthrow the tyranny at Sicyon, which became a Spartan ally. He is also credited with the change in Spartan policy leading to the development of the Peloponnesian League in the sixth century BC. Another legend claims that he died of joy when his son gained the prize for boxing at the Olympic Games, and that his funeral was attended by all the Greeks assembled at the festival.

One of his descendants married king Anaxandridas II of Sparta and had a son with him, king Cleomenes I.

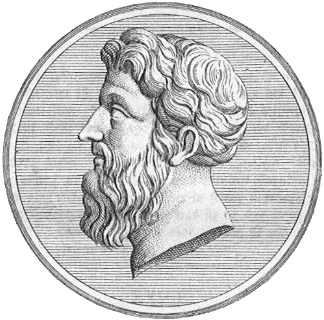
Modern depiction of Chilon

== Sayings and teachings ==
Chilon of Sparta also said the famous Ancient Greek proverb: "Το λακωνίζειν εστί φιλοσοφείν", in English "less is more", or "brevity is the soul of wit", or "brevity is a way of philosophy", which means that the best way of being a philosopher is through brevity and describes the Spartans' way of thinking and attitude. Diogenes Laërtius describes him as a writer of elegiac poems, and attributes many sayings to him:

- "Do not speak evil of the dead."
- "Honor old age."
- "Prefer punishment to disgraceful gain; for the one is painful but once, but the other for one's whole life."
- "Do not laugh at a person in misfortune."
- "If one is strong be also merciful, so that one's neighbors may respect one rather than fear one."
- "Learn how to regulate one's own house well."
- "Do not let one's tongue outrun one's sense."
- "Restrain anger."
- "Do not dislike divination."
- "Do not desire what is impossible."
- "Do not make too much haste on one's road."
- "Obey the laws."

According to an inscription at the Bath of the Seven Sages in Ostia "cunning Chilon taught to fart silently." Chilon was the sage traditionally credited with the famous Delphic maxim: "Know thyself"—though this attribution is not universal, and others of the Seven Sages of Greece, or even the god Apollo himself, were also variously supposed to be its originators.
