= Priam Painter =

Ancient Greek vase painter

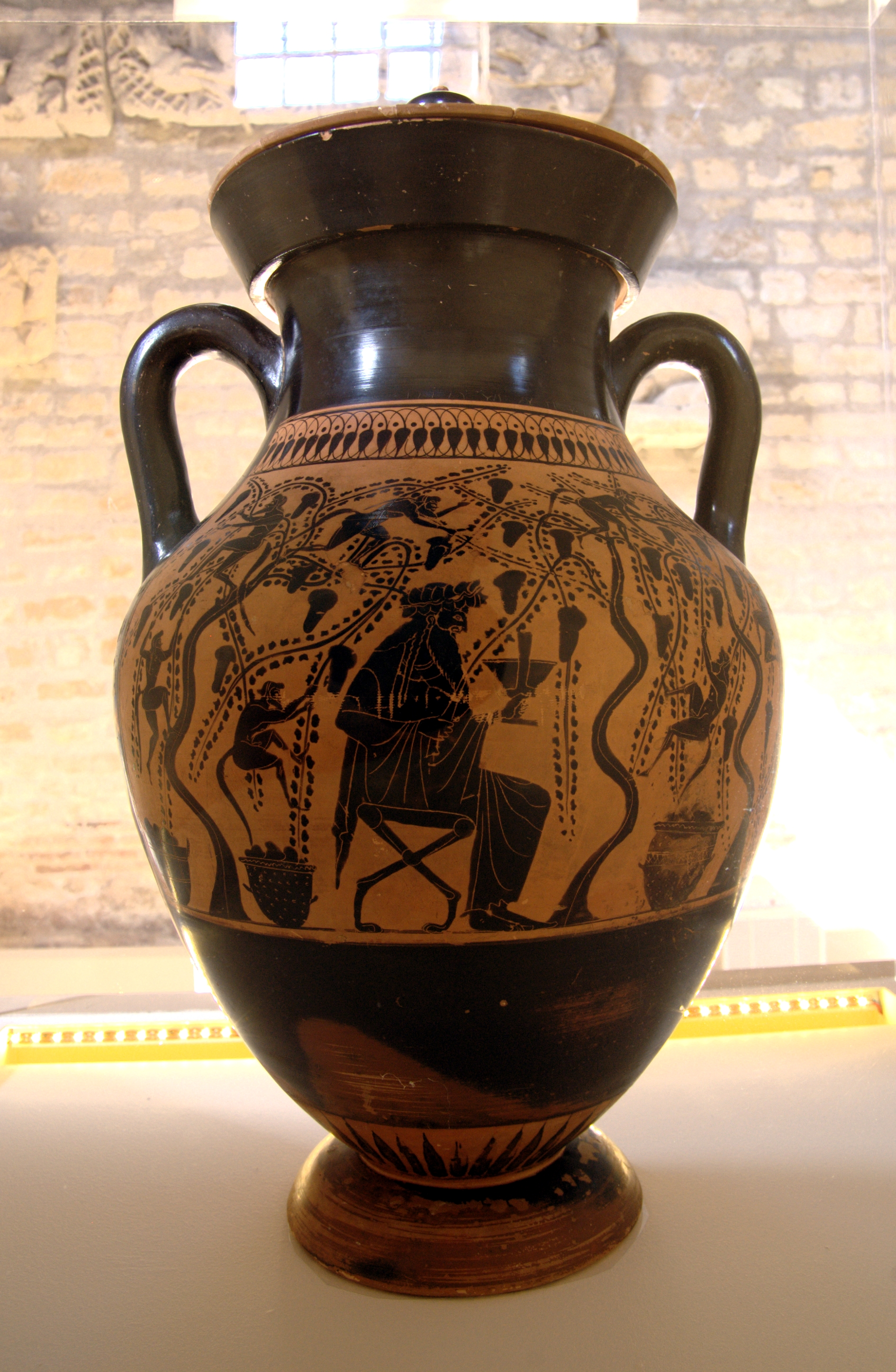
- Amphora by the Priam Painter, depicting Dionysos and satyrs in a vineyard. Late 6th century BC. Rome: Museo Nazionale di Villa Giulia
- Born: Unknown. The name comes from a painting of Priam standing by a chariot. Before 510 BC; Probably Athens
- Known for: Vase painting
- Movement: Black-figure style

The Priam Painter was a vase painter in the black-figure technique, active in Athens during the late 6th century BC.

He is considered one of the more skilled, and more productive, painters of his time. Some scholars have such a high opinion of him that they draw a connection with the Antimenes Painter of the Leagros Group. His range of subjects is rather limited, but his execution is highly detailed, imaginative and indicates great compositional skill. His most frequent motifs are chariot races in the presence of Athena and Herakles, as well as scenes set at public fountains, and scenes of bathing nymphs. These choices have been interpreted as indicating support of the Peisistratid dynasty – as that ruling family identified especially with Athena and had constructed a number of fountain houses in the city. According to that interpretation, the vases must have been produced shortly before the Peisistratids were driven from Athens in 510 BC.

Stylistically, the Priam Painter is close to the Rycroft Painter.

== Bibliography ==
- John Beazley: Attic Black-Figure Vase-Painters. Oxford 1956
- John Beazley: Paralipomena. Additions to Attic black-figure vase-painters and to Attic red-figure vase-painters. Oxford 1971.
- John Boardman: Schwarzfigurige Vasen aus Athen. Ein Handbuch. Mainz 1977, ISBN 3-8053-0233-9, S. 123f.
