= Wappenmünzen =

Earliest attested Athenian coinage

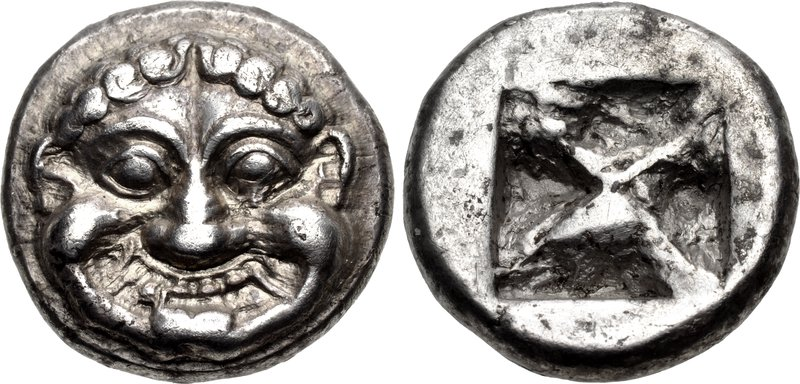
Wappenmünzen didrachm featuring the Gorgoneion design, c. 545-525 BCE

Wappenmünzen (German: Wappenmünzen, lit. 'Heraldic coins', singular Wappenmünze, pronounced [ˈvapənˌmʏntsə]) are the earliest attested form of Athenian coinage, minted in Ancient Athens under the Peisistratids during the late 6th century BCE. The term refers to an array of silver and electrum coinage minted prior to the use of the Owl of Athena, an emblematic design used on all later Athenian coinage. Initially interpreted by numismatists as the heraldic devices of Athenian noble families, the varied designs of the wappenmünzen are now generally thought to represent individual mint magistrates, in line with contemporary practices in East Greek coinage. In contrast to later Athenian silver coins, the wappenmünzen were minted from imported silver, predating the Classical expansion of the Laurion Mines.

== History ==
=== Summary ===
Although Athenian historical works such as Aristotle's Athenaion politeia attributes a reform of Athenian coinage to Solon, modern scholarship interprets Solon's economic reforms as referring to the weights of raw silver for trade expressed in units of drachma, rather than minted coinage.

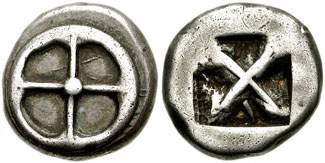
Wappenmünzen didrachm with four-spoked wheel, 545-510 BCE.

The initial date for the minting of wappenmünzen is generally placed during the rule of Peisistratus. Dates corresponding to his first (c. 560 BCE) or final tyranny (c. 546 – 527 BCE) are both plausible, although dates in the early portion of his third tyranny are supported by the need to finance military expeditions during this period, leading to a tentative date of c. 546–535 BCE.

Fourteen distinct wappenmünzen issues are attested in the archaeological record, primarily in a didrachm denomination. Late in the Peisistratid era, tetradrachm wappenmünzen were introduced alongside a Gorgoneion design on both the tetradrachm and didrachm. The Gorgoneia wappenmünzen were the first static design of Athenian coinage, and potentially the first two-sided coinage of Ancient Greece. Archaic Athenian electrum coinage is contemporary and typically associated with the later wappenmünzen.

Surface deposits of Attic silver had been exploited since the Middle Helladic period, but these were almost completely exhausted by the 6th century, collaborated by a lack of silver finds in period strata. As underground mining at the Laurion Mines only began during the late 6th century, primary silver sources under the Peisistratids were in Thraco-Macedonian deposits acquired by military expeditions, especially around the Styrmon.

=== Design ===
Wappenmünzen were minted in a variety of obverse designs, although the reverses were primarily an incuse square divided into four segments diagonally. Later in the series, a small 'feline head' within one of the reverse segments, and a fully fledged reverse motif on didrachm and tetradrachm minted shortly before the transition to the 'owl' series.

=== Electrum issues ===
The late 6th century saw Athens' only mintage of electrum coinage, usually classified as wappenmünzen due to their age and shared designs. Three obverse designs of electrum wappenmünzen are known, featuring bulls, wheels, and owls. The bull and wheel types share the quadripartite incuse square characteristic of other wappenmünzen, but the owl type features a controversially interpreted reverse design (possibly an alpha, delta, or alpha-tau monogram) not characteristic of any other archaic Greek coinage. The electrum owl coins, of which eight specimens are known, have been described as a possible 19th-century forgery.
