= Rycroft Painter =

Ancient Greek vase painter

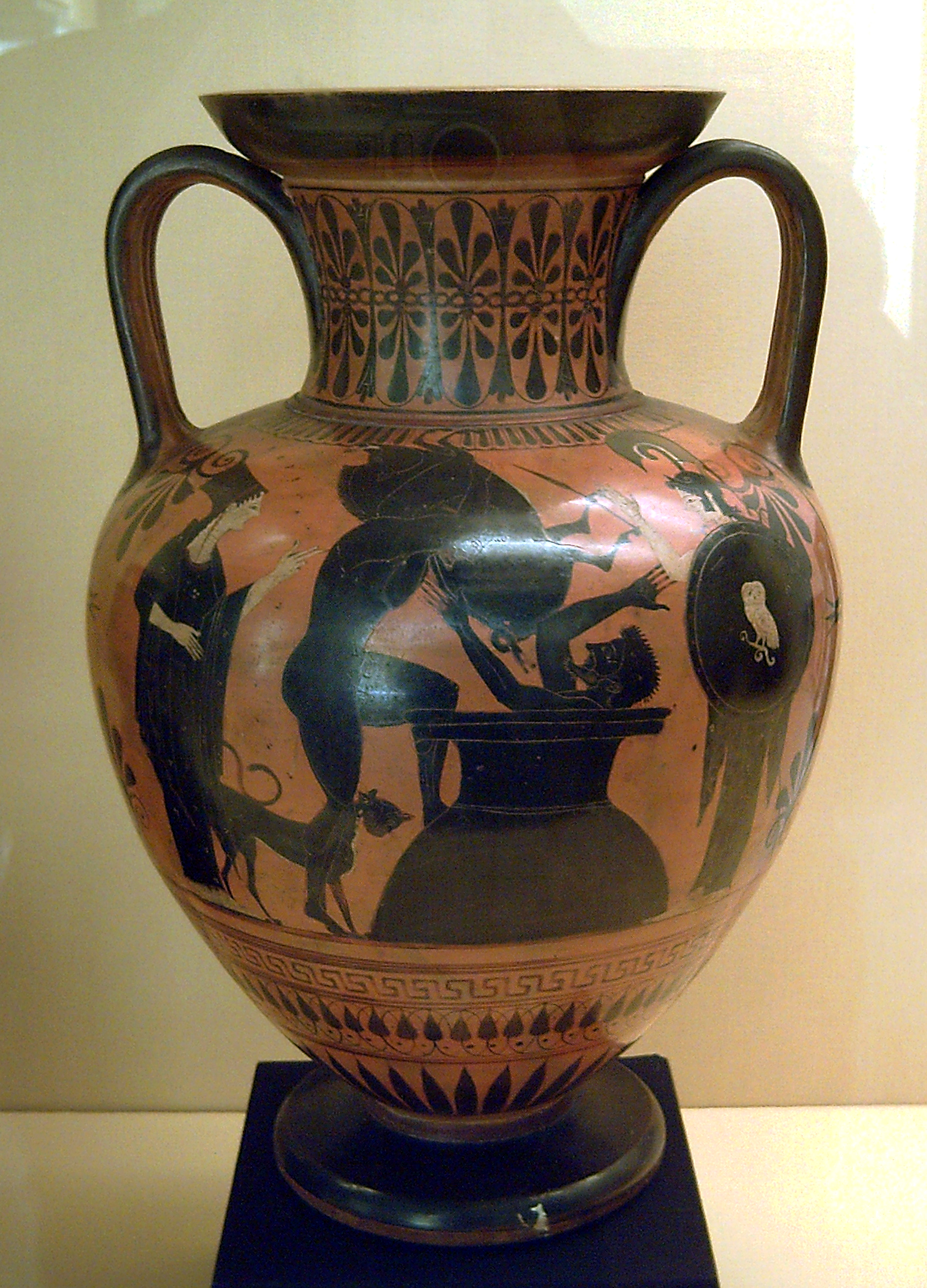
Herakles forcibly presenting the Erymanthian Boar to the king Eurystheus, cowering in a wine vessel, as the goddesses Artemis (left) and Athena look on, depicted on an Attic black-figure amphora (515–500 BC) by the Rycroft Painter

The Rycroft Painter was an Attic late black-figure vase painter, active in the final decade of the sixth century BC. His real name is not known.

His work is closely connected with that of the contemporary red-figure technique, which was then in the process of replacing black-figure as the dominant style. His figures are often drawn as silhouettes. He often painted Dionysiac scenes, but his best works are those focusing on depictions of posture and dignity. They were usually on belly amphorae of type A. He is close in style to the Priam Painter and Psiax, but his talent is not inferior to that of the red-figure painters of the Pioneer Group active at the same time. He was, thus, one of the best vase painters of his style and period. A stylistically close contemporary was the Painter of Tarquinia RC 6847.

== Bibliography ==
- John Beazley: Attic Black-Figure Vase-Painters, Oxford 1956, p.
- John Beazley: Paralipomena. Additions to Attic black-figure vase-painters and to Attic red-figure vase-painters. Oxford 1971. p.
- John Boardman: Schwarzfigurige Vasen aus Athen. Ein Handbuch, Mainz 1977, ISBN 3-8053-0233-9, p. 124
