= Aeantides =

Aeantides (Ancient Greek: Αἰαντίδης) is the name of several people in Classical antiquity:

- Aeantides, the tyrant of Lampsacus, to whom Hippias gave his daughter Archedice in marriage.
- Aeantides, a tragic poet of Alexandria, mentioned as one of the seven poets who formed the Alexandrian Pleiad. He lived in the time of Ptolemy II.
