= Pisistratus =

6th-century BC tyrant of ancient Athens

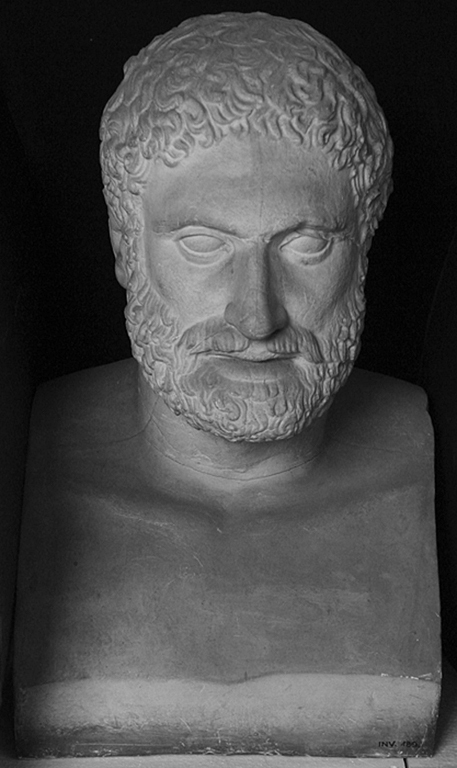

Tyrant of Athens
- In office 561 BC, 559–556 BC, 546–527 BC
- Succeeded by: Hippias

Personal details
- Born: c. 600 BC Philaidai
- Died: Spring 527 BC (aged c. 73) Athens
- Children: Hipparchus, Hippias, Iophon and Hegesistratus
- Parent: Hippocrates

Pisistratus (also spelled Peisistratus or Peisistratos; Greek: Πεισίστρατος Peisistratos; c. 600 BC – 527 BC) was a politician in ancient Athens, ruling as tyrant in the late 560s, the early 550s and from 546 BC until his death. His unification of Attica, the triangular peninsula of Greece containing Athens, along with economic and cultural improvements laid the groundwork for the later pre-eminence of Athens in ancient Greece. His legacy lies in the strengthening of the Athenian economy, the relief of poor farmers, the wider integration of the Eleusinian Mysteries and Dionysia festival into Athenian observance, and the first attempt at producing a definitive version of the Homeric epics. Pisistratus's championing of the lower class of Athens is an early example of populism. While in power, he did not hesitate to confront the aristocracy and greatly reduce their privileges, confiscating their lands and giving them to the poor. Pisistratus funded many religious and artistic programs, in order to improve the economy and spread the wealth more equally among the Athenian people.

Pisistratids is the common family or clan name for the three tyrants, who ruled in Athens from 546 to 510 BC, referring to Pisistratus and his two sons, Hipparchus and Hippias.

== Background ==
Ancient Greek governments were typically monarchies in the 10th and 9th centuries BC. In the 7th and 6th centuries, political power began to be wielded by aristocratic families, who had accumulated wealth, land, and religious or political offices as the Greek city-states developed. The most notable families could trace their lineage back to a legendary or mythological founder/king, such as Herakles or an ancestor who participated in the Trojan War, for example. In the 6th and 5th centuries BC, prominent aristocratic families of Athens were the Pisistratids, Philaids, and the Alcmaeonids. The Pisistratid clan traced their ancestry back to Neleus of Pylos, father of the Homeric hero Nestor, who fought in the Trojan War.

The second clan, the Alcmaeonids, came to prominence in the 6th century BC during the lifetime of their namesake Alcmaeon and whose son, Megacles, both opposed and supported Pisistratus at various points in his reign. Due to the infighting between aristocratic families and the inability to maintain order, a tyrant was well-positioned to capitalise on the discontent of the poor and disenfranchised to make a bid for power. In the age of antiquity and especially in the Archaic Age of Greece, a tyrant was not viewed in the modern sense of the definition, but rather, a ruler who obtained power unconstitutionally, usually through the use of force, or inherited such power. In the first documented instance of Athenian tyranny, Herodotus notes the story of Cylon, an ancient Olympic Games champion, who gathered supporters, in either 636 or 632 BC, in an attempt to seize power by occupying the Acropolis. His attempt was unsuccessful and despite assurances to the contrary, Cylon and his supporters were allegedly killed by the Alcmaeonids, resulting in the Alcmaeonid curse.

Related to Pisistratus through his mother, Solon was an Athenian statesman and lawmaker who, in the early 6th century BC, restructured the social class system of Athens as well as reformed the law code, originated by Draco. Among his many reforms, Solon eliminated debt slavery, which primarily affected poor Athenians, who were in the majority, giving the demos — the common people of the city-state — collectively a concession to ease their suffering and possibly preventing a civil war. Pisistratus's later rise to power would draw on support from many of the poor people composing this constituency.

== Early life and rise to power ==
Location of Attica region on the mainland of Greece

Pisistratus was a native of the deme of Philaidae near Brauron in eastern Attica. Not much is known about the early years of Pisistratus's life, but his father, Hippocrates, attended the Olympic Games in either 608 or 604, and during a sacrifice to the gods, the meat was said to have been boiled without a fire, as witnessed by Chilon the Lacedaemonian. As a result of this sign, Chilon recommended that Hippocrates send away his wife, if she could bear children, and if he had a son, to disown him. Hippocrates did not follow Chilon's advice, and later, he had a son named Pisistratus.

Originally, Pisistratus became known as an Athenian general who captured the port of Nisaea (or Nisaia) in the nearby city-state of Megara in approximately 565 BC. This victory opened up the unofficial trade blockage that had been contributing to food shortages in Athens during the previous several decades.

In the subsequent years after Solon and his departure from Athens, Aristotle reports that the city of Athens was still very divided and in turmoil, with many secondary sources noting the development of three distinct political factions competing for control of Athens and its government. According to Aristotle, these groups were partitioned in both a geographic (as documented below) and economic sense. The first two factions, based on the plains and the coast, appeared to exist prior to the formation of the third faction. The third group, referred to as men of the Highlands (or Hill), had various motives to align with Pisistratus, including those men in poverty, recent immigrants who feared loss of citizenship, and lenders who were denied the ability to collect their debts. Names of the competing factions differ according to the accessed source, with some references offering details on each group's composition while others do not:

- Pedieis or Pediakoi: the population that resided on the plains, led by Lycurgus. These landowners produced grain, giving them leverage during the food shortage.
- Paralioi or Paraloi: the population living along the coast, led by Megacles, an Alcmaeonid. The Paralioi party was not as strong as the Pedieis, primarily because they could not produce grain, like the plainsmen. With the Megareans patrolling the sea, much of Athens's import/export power was limited.
- Hyperakrioi: not previously represented by the first two factions or parties listed above, dwelled primarily in the hills and were by far the poorest of the Athenian population. Their only production was barter in items like honey and wool. Pisistratus organised them into a third faction, the Hyperakrioi, or hill dwellers. This party grossly outnumbered the other two parties combined. R.J. Hopper provides similar names for the factions and classifies them by their region in Attica: Pedion, Paralia, and Diakria.

Sarah B. Pomeroy and her fellow three authors state the three factions of Athens are as follows:

- the Men of the Plain: the population composed mostly of large landowners.
- the Men of the Coast: the population likely including fishermen and craftsmen.
- the Men of the Hill: the population containing the poorer residents of the Attic highlands, and possibly including residents of cities of Attica as well.

Herodotus provides the following information about the three groups:

- Plains district: led by Lycurgus, son of Aristoleides.
- Coastal district: led by Megacles, son of Alcmaeon.
- Hill district: formed by Pisistratus in an effort to become tyrant of Athens.

His role in the Megarian conflict gained Pisistratus popularity in Athens, but he did not have the political clout to seize power. Around the year 561 BC, Herodotus writes how Pisistratus intentionally wounded himself and his mules, asking the Athenian people to provide bodyguards for protection and reminding them of his prior accomplishments, including the port capture of Nisaea. Pisistratus had driven his chariot into the agora or marketplace of Athens, claiming he had been wounded by his enemies outside of town, and thus, the people of Athens selected some of their men to function as a bodyguard, armed with clubs rather than spears, for him. Previously, he had assumed control of the Hyperakrioi, which was not an aristocratic group like the other two Athens factions, by promoting his democratic program and securing a mutual agreement with the members or demos of the faction. By obtaining support from this vast number of the poorer population and receiving the protection of bodyguards, he was able to overrun and seize the Acropolis as well as grasp the reins of the government. The Athenians were open to a tyranny similar to that under Solon, who previously had been offered the tyranny of Athens but declined, and in the early part of the Archaic Age, the rivalries among the aristocratic clans was fierce, making a single-ruler tyranny an attractive option, with the promise of possible stability and internal peace, and Pisistratus's ruse won him further prominence. With the Acropolis in his possession and with the support of his bodyguard, he declared himself tyrant.

== Periods of power/three attempts at tyranny ==
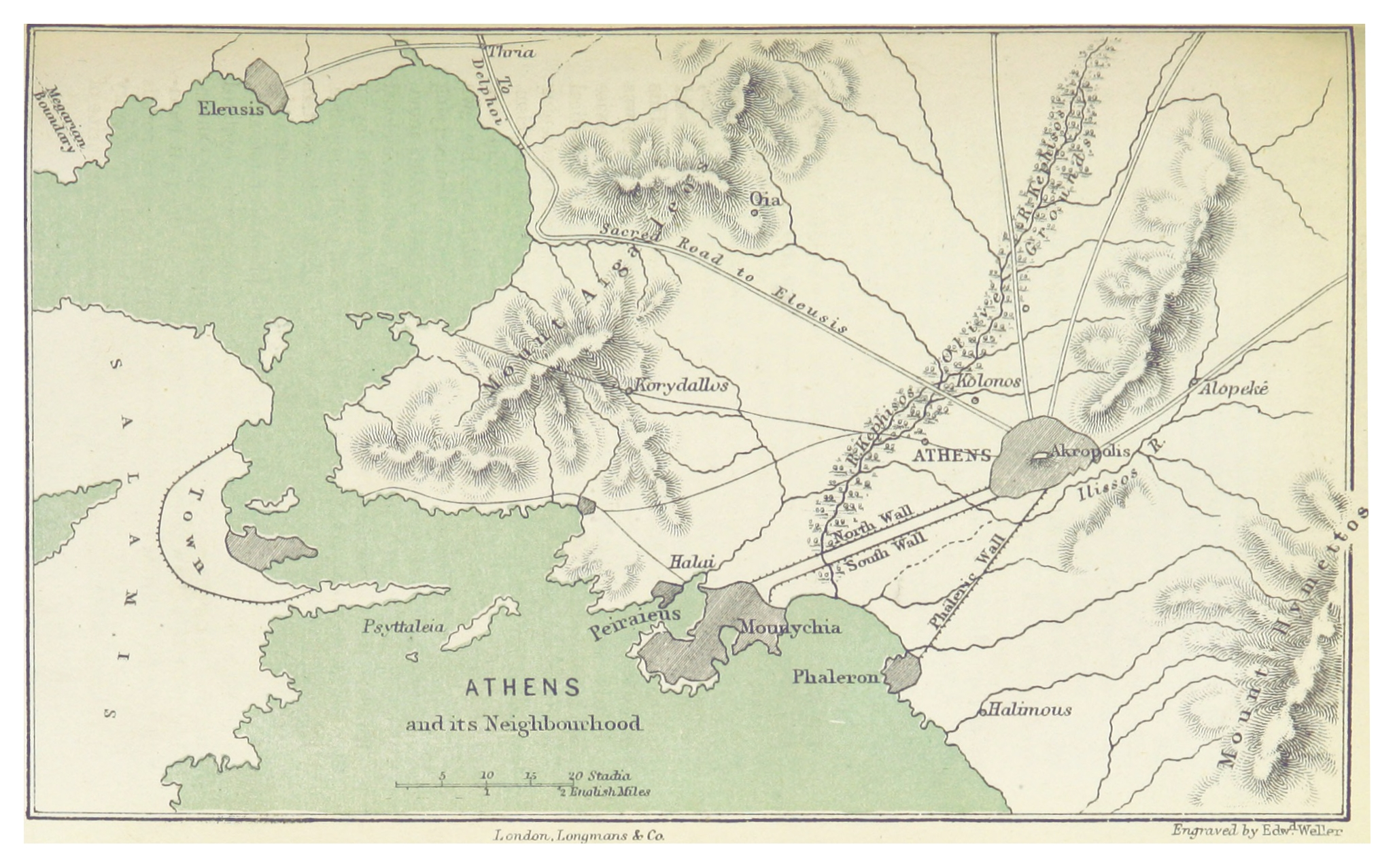
City of ancient Athens and its surrounding towns. The Long Walls shown were not built until the 5th century BC.

=== First period of power ===
Pisistratus assumed and held power for three different periods of time, ousted from political office and exiled twice during his reign, before taking command of Athens for the third, final, and longest period of time from 546–528 BC. His first foray into power started in the year 561 and lasted about five years. His first ouster from office was circa 556/555 BC after the other two factions, the Plains people led by Lycurgus and the Coastal people led by Megacles, normally at odds with each other, joined forces and removed him from power. Different sources provide conflicting or unspecified time intervals for the periods of Pisistratus's reign. For example, Herodotus writes that Megacles's and Lycurgus's followers combined after a short time to expel Pisistratus from power. Aristotle comments that Pisistratus was forced out during the year of the archonship of Hegesias, five years after he originally assumed his first tyranny in Athens.

In this period (557–556 BC), one of the Athenian polemarchs was Charmus of Kolyttus, who had been eromenos of Pisistratus. Charmus was the first Athenian to dedicate an altar to Eros, god of love.

=== Exile and second period of power ===
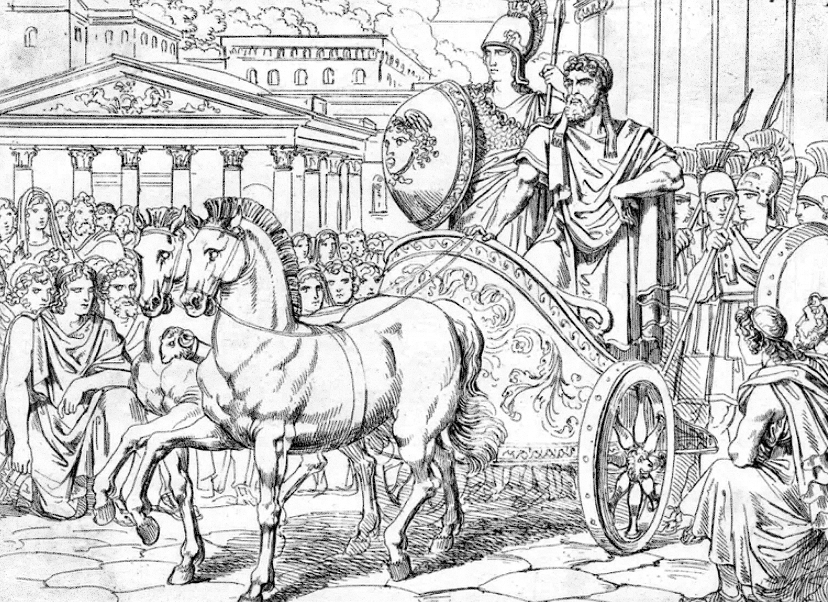
Illustration from 1838 by M. A. Barth depicting the return of Pisistratus to Athens, accompanied by a woman dressed as Athena, as described by the Greek historian Herodotus

He was exiled for three to six years during which the agreement between the Pedieis (Plains) and the Paralioi (Coast) fell apart. Soon after, in the year 556 BC or so, Megacles invited Pisistratus back for a return to power upon the condition Pisistratus marry Megacles's daughter, Coesyra. According to Herodotus, the two men concocted a creative method to rally the people of Athens back to Pisistratus's side. A tall, almost six foot woman, Phye, from the deme or rural village of Paiania was selected to pose as the goddess Athena, by being dressed in full armour, riding in a chariot, and being counselled on how to portray the goddess. Heralds were sent ahead to announce that Athena herself was bringing Pisistratus back to her acropolis and that she exalted him above all other men. Word travelled fast to the people throughout the villages and even to those in the city believing that Phye was the goddess Athena and consequently, Pisistratus was welcomed back by the awestruck Athenians.

How much of this story is based in facts versus an oral fabrication or exaggeration passed down to Herodotus is not entirely known. Lavelle writes that this story provides a Homer-type mythological tie-in to the connection between the gods and Greek heroes where Pisistratus's prior resume as a warrior and general would be viewed as heroic and furthermore, Pisistratus would be viewed in a similar manner as the Greek hero Odysseus, who was viewed as cunning and having a special relationship with Athena. It is debated to what extent this staged event impacted the return of many to his side. Krentz postulates that the story should be viewed in the context of a premeditated performance of Athena returning to the temple dedicated to her. While some argue that the general public believed he had won the favour of the goddess, others instead put forward the idea that the public were aware that he was using the chariot ride as a political manoeuvre, drawing comparisons between himself and the ancient kings of Athens.

=== Conflict, second exile, and return to power for third time ===
Soon after, Herodotus reports that Pisistratus, who had been previously married and had two grown sons, did not want to have any children with his new wife, the daughter of Megacles, and would not have intercourse with her in the traditional manner. Apparently, Pisistratus was unwilling to compromise the political futures of his sons, Hipparchus and Hippias. Furious, Megacles broke off this short-lived alliance with Pisistratus and drove him into exile for a second time, with the help of Pisistratus's enemies. During the length of his exile lasting approximately ten years, Pisistratus relocated to Rhaicelus or Rhaecelus, notable for its good agricultural base, in the Strymon river region of northern Greece, and eventually settled in the vicinity of Mount Pangaeus or Pangaion, accumulating wealth from the gold and silver mines located nearby. Financed by the mining money, he hired mercenary soldiers and bolstered with the support of allies such as the Thebans and the affluent Lygdamis of the island Naxos, he looked southward for a return to power.

In 546 BC, using Eretria as a base and supported by Eretrian cavalry, Pisistratus landed at Marathon on the northern side of Attica and advanced towards Athens, joined by some local sympathizers from Athens and the surrounding demes. The Athenians mustered a force in opposition and met Pisistratus's forces at Pallene. Providing some background details, Herodotus comments that just before the battle commences a seer gave Pisistratus a prophecy that the net has been cast and the tuna will swarm through. With the prophecy both welcomed and understood by Pisistratus, his troops advanced and attacked the Athenian forces who were resting after lunch, easily routing them. While the Athenians retreated and in order to prevent them from reforming their forces, Pisistratus directed his sons to ride after the routed Athenians and announce that they should return home, retaining no anxiety or fear from the situation at hand. With those instructions, the Athenians complied and Pisistratus was able to return to rule Athens for a third time as tyrant, with his reign lasting from 546 BC till his death in 528 or 527 BC.

== Achievements and contributions to Athens during third and final tyranny ==
Location of cities of ancient Greece and neighbors; Mt. Pangaeus

Analysis of secondary sources regarding both the length, as mentioned previously, and the accomplishments of Pisistratus's first two tyrannies are conflicting and very sparse in details, respectively. For instance, Lavelle hypothesises that Megacles and the Alcmaeonids still held the majority of the political offices in the Athens government as part of the price and negotiation process that Pisistratus had to pay in order to become tyrant, and consequently, Pisistratus perhaps only functioned as a figurehead during his first two times in power.

During the three reigns of Pisistratus in the mid to latter part of the 6th century BC, Athens was beginning its transition to becoming the largest and most dominant of the cities on the Attic peninsula. Starr states that Athens was coalescing into the framework of a city, rather than a loose affiliation of neighbouring villages. Perhaps next in importance was Piraeus, the main port city of Attica, just 5 miles southwest of Athens, and this port location was key to granting Athens easy access to maritime trade opportunities and the ocean waterways. Other notable cities in Attica include Marathon and Eleusis.

=== Culture, religion, and arts ===
With an emphasis on promoting the city of Athens as a cultural centre and enhancing his prestige, Pisistratus instituted a number of actions to show his support for the gods and patronage of the arts. A permanent copying of Homer's Iliad and Odyssey was commissioned by Pisistratus and he also increased the visibility of the Panathenaic festival, whose origins date from earlier in the 6th century and was celebrated to a large degree every four years, with scaled-down versions of the festival every year. Due to the expansion of the Panathenaic festival, Athena became the most revered goddess of Athens, in essence the patron god of the city-state, and the end of the festival would see a parade travelling to Athena's temple at the Acropolis, featuring a robe for the deity made by young Athenian women. Recitations of Homeric poems and athletic competitions became part of the festivities and prizes were given to the winners.

New festivals were inaugurated such as the greater and lesser Dionysia, which honoured Dionysus, the god of wine and pleasure, and vase paintings of that period highlighted drinking and exuberant celebratory scenes. At the Dionysia festival, prizes were granted for the singing of dithyrambs and by the year 534 BC approximately, tragedy plays were an annual competition occurrence. Control of the temple of Demeter, located in Eleusis and honouring the goddesses Demeter and Persephone, was also accomplished by Pisistratus and as a result, the floor plan of a great hall, the Telesterion, was redesigned so a much larger building (27m by 30m) could be built on site, with completion during the last few years of Pisistratus's reign or during the time of his sons' rule. Completely made of stone, the Telesterion had marble upper works, a Doric style portico, and tiles. The Greater Mysteries festival at Eleusis was an annual event held in the fall of each year, and was a Pan-Hellenic cult event for people both inside and outside of the Attica region. Other minor local cults sprinkled throughout Attica were either relocated entirely or in part to the city of Athens.

== Policy: domestic and foreign ==
=== Domestic ===
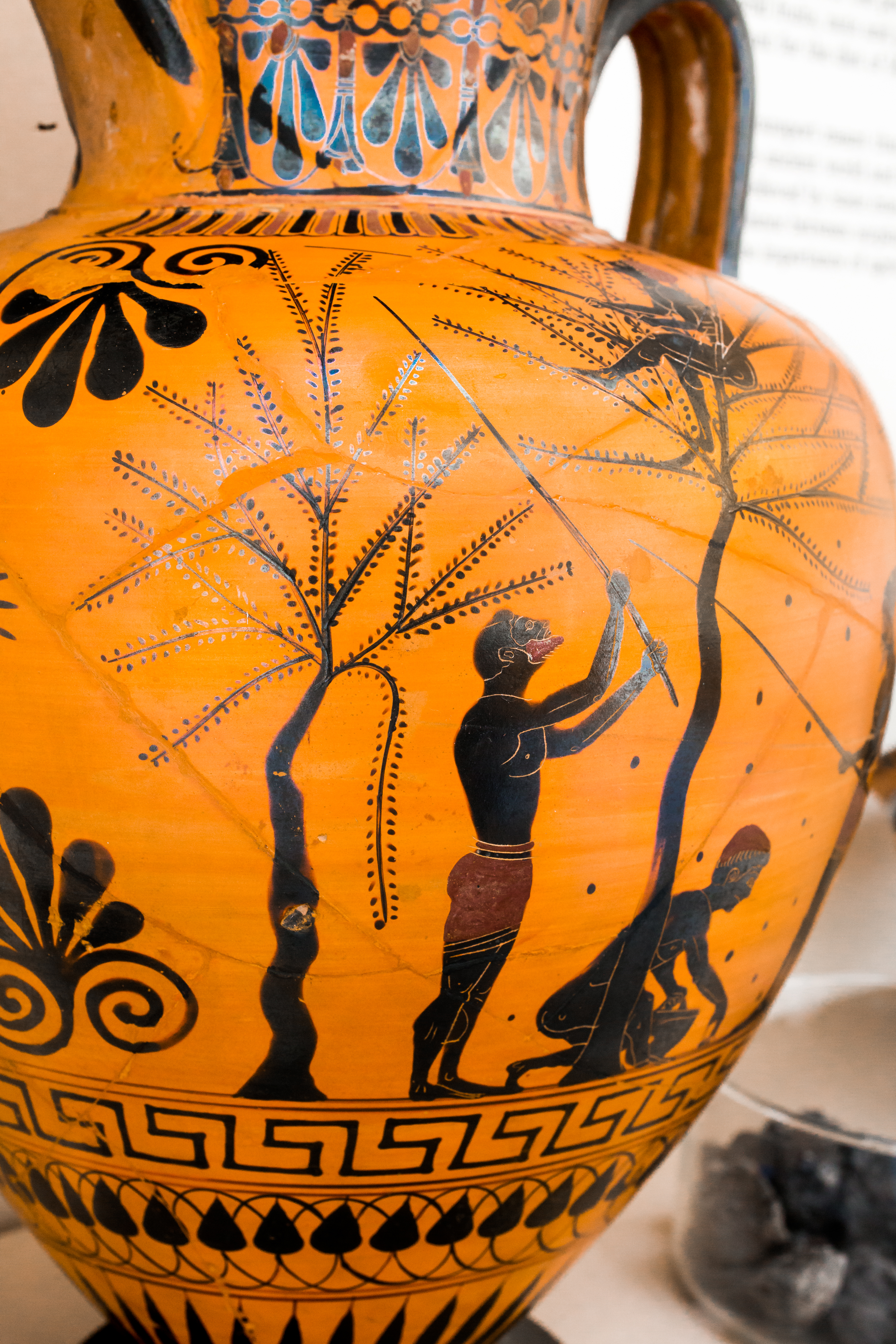
Men harvesting olives (c. 520 BC); British Museum, London

One of the major areas of focus for Pisistratus and his government was the economy, and building and expanding on what his predecessor, Solon, had originally started. Pisistratus, likewise, had a two pronged approach: improve and modify agricultural production as well as expand commerce. In terms of agriculture, Solon had previously initiated a focus on the growth and cultivation of olives, which were better suited to the Athenian climate, as a cash crop. Pisistratus reintroduced a focus on olive production and in conjunction, he allocated funds to help the peasants outside the city of Athens, who were a key constituent bloc of his party, the Hyperakrioi, to obtain land as well as purchase tools and farm equipment. The small farmer loans were funded in large part by an assessment or tax on agricultural production, a rare documented example of an Athenian direct tax, at a rate of ten percent according to Aristotle. A secondary source reports that the tax was closer to five percent. Consequently, providing loans and monies to the rural residents surrounding Athens allowed them to continue working in the fields and to perhaps have them be uninterested in the politics of the city-state.

Pisistratus also initiated a travelling system of judges throughout the countryside to conduct trials on location and even the tyrant himself would occasionally accompany these groups for inspection purposes and conflict resolution. At one point, Pisistratus appeared before the court in his own defence, charged with murder, but the prosecution/accuser dropped the charges, being reluctant or afraid to move forward in the case.

On the commerce side, Athenian or Attic pottery was a key export, with small numbers of pottery beginning to arrive in the Black Sea, Italian, and French regions (the modern-day names for these regions) in the 7th century. Under Solon, beginning in the early part of the 6th century, these black-figure pottery commodities began to be exported in ever increasing numbers and distance from Athens, arriving throughout the Aegean and Mediterranean Sea regions. Pisistratus continued to expand this vital pottery trade, with the black-figure pottery being found in Ionia, Cyprus, and as far east as Syria, while to the west, Spain was the most distant market. The popularity of Athenian pottery was noteworthy in the fact that its numbers eventually began to surpass Corinthian pottery exports.

As for the city of Athens itself, Pisistratus embarked on a public building project campaign to improve the infrastructure and architecture of Athens, building new and upgrading old. His administration built roads and worked to improve the water supply of Athens. An aqueduct was connected to the Enneakrounos fountain at the edge of the agora and this marketplace was improved by revising the market lay-out in a more systematic way, improving both its effectiveness and use of space. Archaeologists have discovered agora markers from the 6th century supporting such a claim. Aristocrats had previously owned their private wells and Pisistratus elected to construct fountain houses with public access to water. On the Acropolis, the temple of Athena was reconstructed as the 6th century progressed, and during Pisistratus's rule, the building of a very large temple dedicated to Zeus was initiated, stopped upon his death, resumed several centuries later, and finally completed by Hadrian, a Roman emperor, in 131 AD. Public rather than private patronage became the hallmark of a Pisistratus-ruled society, providing a steady source of construction jobs to those citizens in need and more affordable housing in the city centre. Consequently, more people were able to move to the city of Athens.

Didrachm of Athens, 545–510 BC
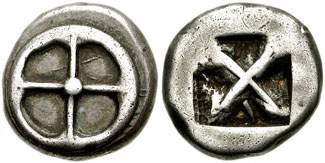
First side of the image: Obv: Four-spoked wheel
Second side of the image: Rev: Incuse square, divided diagonally
Silver didrachm of Athens of heraldic type from the time of Pisistratus, 545–510 BC

To finance these public infrastructure projects as well as increasing the depth and variety of cultural and arts offerings, Pisistratus used the revenue streams generated from the mining at Mount Pangaeus in northern Greece and the silver mines located closer to home at Laurion, owned by the state, in Attica. However, despite evidence of silver coinage, R. J. Hopper writes that silver was indeed produced during this time, but the amount is unclear for the years prior to 484 or 483 BC and it is possible that historians and researchers have overestimated the importance of the mines.

Regarding the minting of silver coins, evidence of this production started to appear in the early 6th century in various Greek city-states. Pomeroy contends that the first stamping of coins, imprinted with the image of an owl, was initiated by either Pisistratus or his sons. This owl depiction symbolised the goddess of wisdom, Athena, and these coins quickly became the most widely recognized currency in the Aegean region. Meanwhile, Verlag argues that the minting most likely started in the first decade of Pisistratus's third reign in power (546 to circa 535 BC), but the design was the so-called Wappenmünzen (heraldic coins) at first and then followed by a change to the owl currency version. The dating and placement of this change is uncertain, either late in the Pisistratid dynastic era or early in the democratic era of Athens.

=== Foreign ===
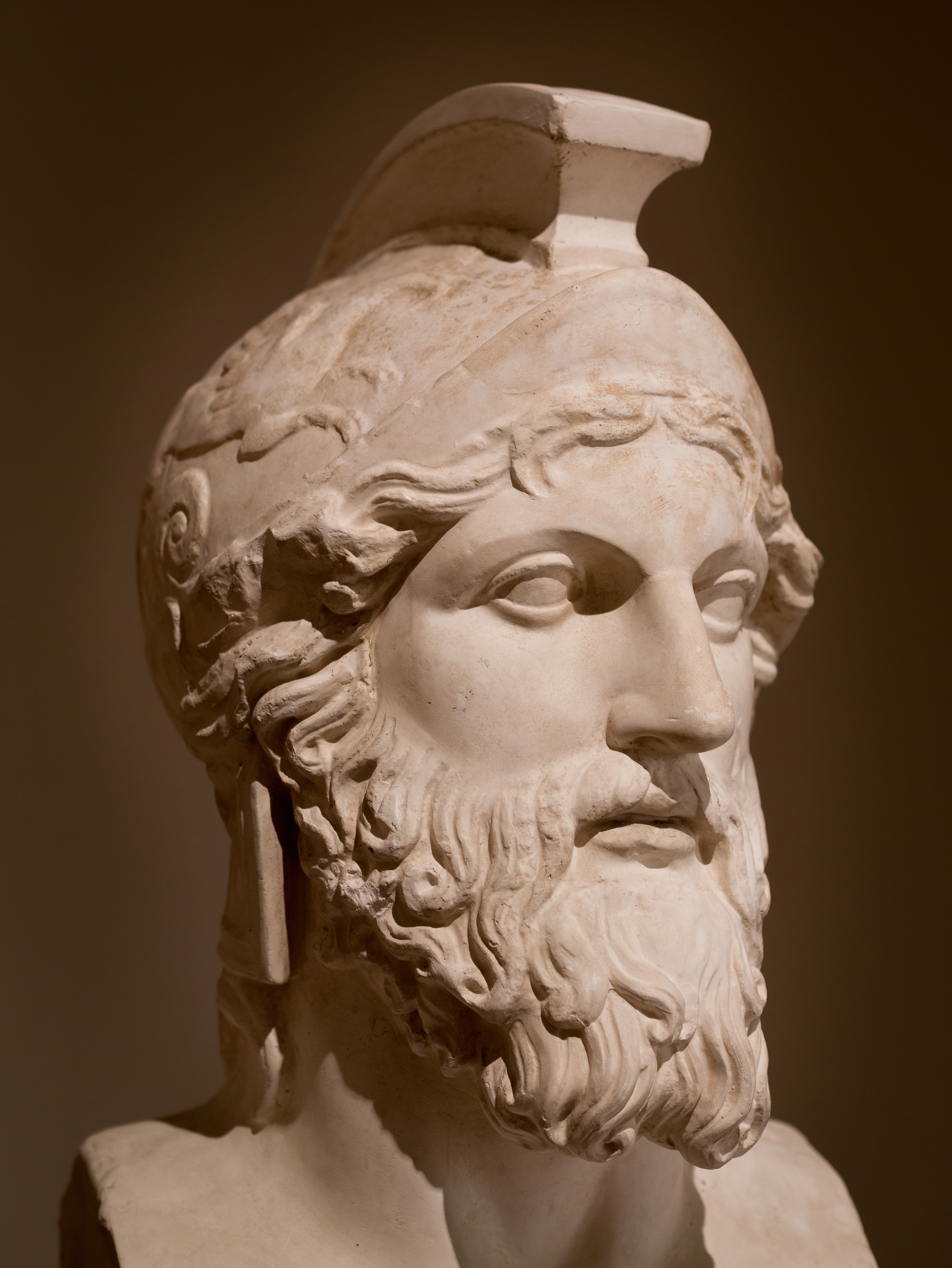
Roman copy of Greek bust of Miltiades (original dating to 5th–4th century BC)

In conjunction with the burgeoning Athenian commerce, Pisistratus conducted a foreign policy, especially in the central Aegean Sea, with the intent of building alliances with friendly leaders. On the island of Naxos, the wealthy Lygdamis, who assisted Pisistratus in his triumphant return from his second exile, was installed as ruler and tyrant, and Lygdamis, in turn, placed Polycrates as ruler of the island Samos. Pisistratus re-assumed control of the port city Sigeion or Sigeum, on the coast of western Anatolia (modern-day Turkey), placing one of his sons in charge of the government.

In addition, Pisistratus was able to establish an Athenian presence in the Thracian Chersonese, now known as the Gallipoli peninsula located in modern-day Turkey, by dispatching Miltiades the Elder to rule as tyrant. The Hellespont waterway was a narrow strait of water between the Thracian Chersonese and Anatolia, and the Thracian peninsula was a key location along travel routes between Asia Minor and the European continent. Herodotus reports in the Histories that Miltiades was sent over to take control of the Chersonese at a later time in the 6th century, in the year 516, by the sons of Pisistratus. In the process of assuming power, Miltiades procured the support of 500 mercenaries, in a tactic similar to that of Pisistratus, and married a Thracian princess.

== Popular tyrant ==
In ancient Greece, the word tyrant usually referred to those who seized power without legal right. Some tyrannies were short-lived while others, like Pisistratus's rule, could last quite long, even decades, if perceived to be a tolerable tyranny and accepted by the people. By definition, tyrants obtained their ruling position by force or other unconstitutional means, and they did not inherit this authoritarian role in the manner of a king or via monarchical succession. However, once in power, many tyrants attempted to pass the mantle of leadership to their sons, as did Pisistratus. Usually, a tyrant would come from the ranks of fellow aristocrats, but would frequently rally the poor and powerless to their cause in a bid to obtain power, exemplified by Pisistratus when he formed the Hyperakrioi faction. To ease their transition into power and encourage societal security, tyrants could elect to keep the status quo for government institutions and laws, and even legacy officeholders, rather than purge them.

In Herodotus's view as documented in the Histories, after assuming power for the first time, Pisistratus managed the city of Athens even-handedly and fairly, maintaining the government and political office structure as is with no changes to existing laws. However, after reassuming control in 546 BC for his third stint as head of state, Herodotus says that he firmly established his tyranny with his mercenary force, increased his revenues from mining sources in Attica and Mount Pangaeus, placed opponents' children as hostages on the island of Naxos, and exiled both Alcmaeonids as well as other Athenian dissenters (whether by freely chosen exile or by force is unclear). Pomeroy reaffirms Herodotus's commentary regarding Pisistratus's third turn in power, adding that Pisistratus installed relatives and friends in the offices of various archonships and detained the children of some Athenians as hostages to deter future uprisings and discourage opposition. Some of these actions would contradict the perception that Pisistratus ruled justly and followed the law. Aristotle seconds the initial remarks of Herodotus by characterising Pisistratus's reign as moderate and mild, describing the ruler as having a pleasant and tender disposition. As an illustration, Aristotle relates the case of a member of Pisistratus's entourage encountering a man tilling a stony plot of land and asking what the yield of this land was. The anonymous man responded that he received physical soreness and aches while Pisistratus received one-tenth of this yield. Due to his honesty, or perhaps his cleverness, Pisistratus exempted the man from paying his taxes. Aristotle also comments that Pisistratus's government functioned more in a constitutional manner and less like a tyranny.

Rosivach writes that the Pisistratid dynasty did not fundamentally change the government as originally created by Solon; instead, they maintained power by installing allies in important governmental positions, threatening force as needed, and using marriage alliances, all being tactics residing outside the constitution and law. Forsdyke chronicles the certain usage of Greek words by Herodotus in his Histories in reference to Pisistratus's tyranny and advocates that a society ruled by a tyrant has weak citizens while a democratic society has strong and free people.

== Legacy and aftermath ==
Pisistratus died in 527 or 528 BC, and his eldest son, Hippias, succeeded him as tyrant of Athens. Hippias, along with his brother, Hipparchus, kept many of the existing laws and taxed the Athenians at no more than five percent of their income. In 514 BC, a plot to kill both Hippias and Hipparchus was conceived by two lovers, Harmodius and Aristogeiton, after Hipparchus had unsuccessfully solicited the younger Harmodius and subsequently insulted his sister. However, Hipparchus was the only one assassinated, and per Thucydides, was mistakenly identified as the supreme tyrant due to being the victim. However, Hippias was the actual leader of Athens, remaining in power for another four years. During this time, Hippias became more paranoid and oppressive in his actions, killing many of the Athenian citizens. The Alcmaeonid family helped depose the tyranny by bribing the Delphic oracle to tell the Spartans to liberate Athens, which they did in 510 BC. Following the capture of their children, Hippias and the other Pisistratids were forced to accept the terms dictated by the Athenians to recover their children and were exiled, being provided safe passage to Sigeion.

The surviving Pisistratid ruler, Hippias, eventually joined the court of King Darius of Persia, and went on to aid the Persians in their attack on Marathon (490 BC) during the Greco-Persian Wars, acting as a guide. Upon the fall of the Pisistratid dynasty in 510 and the deposition of Hippias, Cleisthenes of Athens ultimately triumphs in a power struggle, dividing the Athenian citizens into ten new tribes, creating a Council of Five Hundred as a representative assembly, and ushering in the age of democratic government in the year 508/507. According to Pomeroy, the tyranny of Pisistratus and his sons functioned as a social levelling mechanism, regardless of economic status, for those outside the Pisistratid faction and sympathizers. Hence, the democratic style of government that evolved to replace the overthrow of the Pisistratids was aided by the circumstances and outcomes of the outgoing tyranny.

Obol of Athens, 545–525 BC
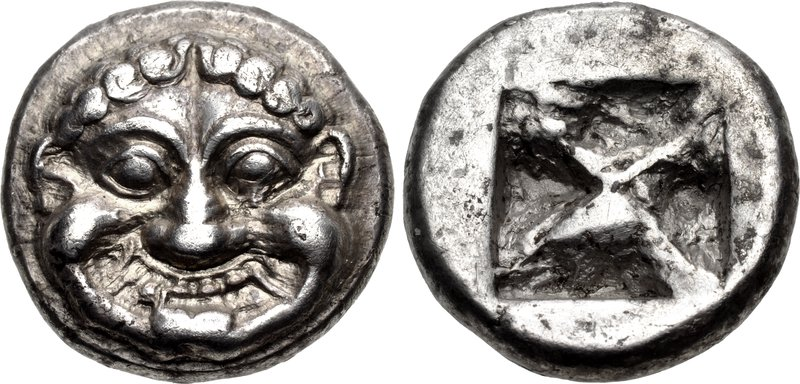
First side of the image: Obv: An archaic Gorgoneion
Second side of the image: Rev: Square incuse
An archaic silver obol of Athens of heraldic type from the time of Peisistratos, 545–525 BC

Upon the passing of Pisistratus, the coalescing of Athens and its city-state population into a tightly knit society, both of a religious and civil nature, was well underway, even though Athens was still much less influential militarily and politically compared to Sparta, its future ally and rival of the upcoming 5th century BC. Per Aristotle, the tyranny during the time of Pisistratus was commonly thought of as "the age of gold". This reference to an age of gold harkened back to the mythological god Cronos (Cronus), who ruled during what was called the Golden Age.

During the era of Athenian democracy, the development of ostracism, the expelling of a citizen for up to ten years, as a governmental management tool arose in reaction to the tyranny of the Pisistratids, and was envisioned, in part, as a defence against potential tyrants or individuals who amassed too much power or influence.

The poet Dante in Canto XV of the Purgatorio, the second instalment of the Divine Comedy, references Pisistratus as responding in a gentle way when interacting with an admirer of his daughter.

According to Suda, the bodyguards of Pisistratus were called "wolf-feet" (Λυκόποδες), because they always had their feet covered with wolf-skins, to prevent frostbite; alternatively, because they had a wolf symbol on their shields.

== See also ==
- Land reform in Athens
- Stasis (ancient Greece)
