= Hipparchus (brother of Hippias) =

Tyrant of Athens from c. 528 BC to 514 BC

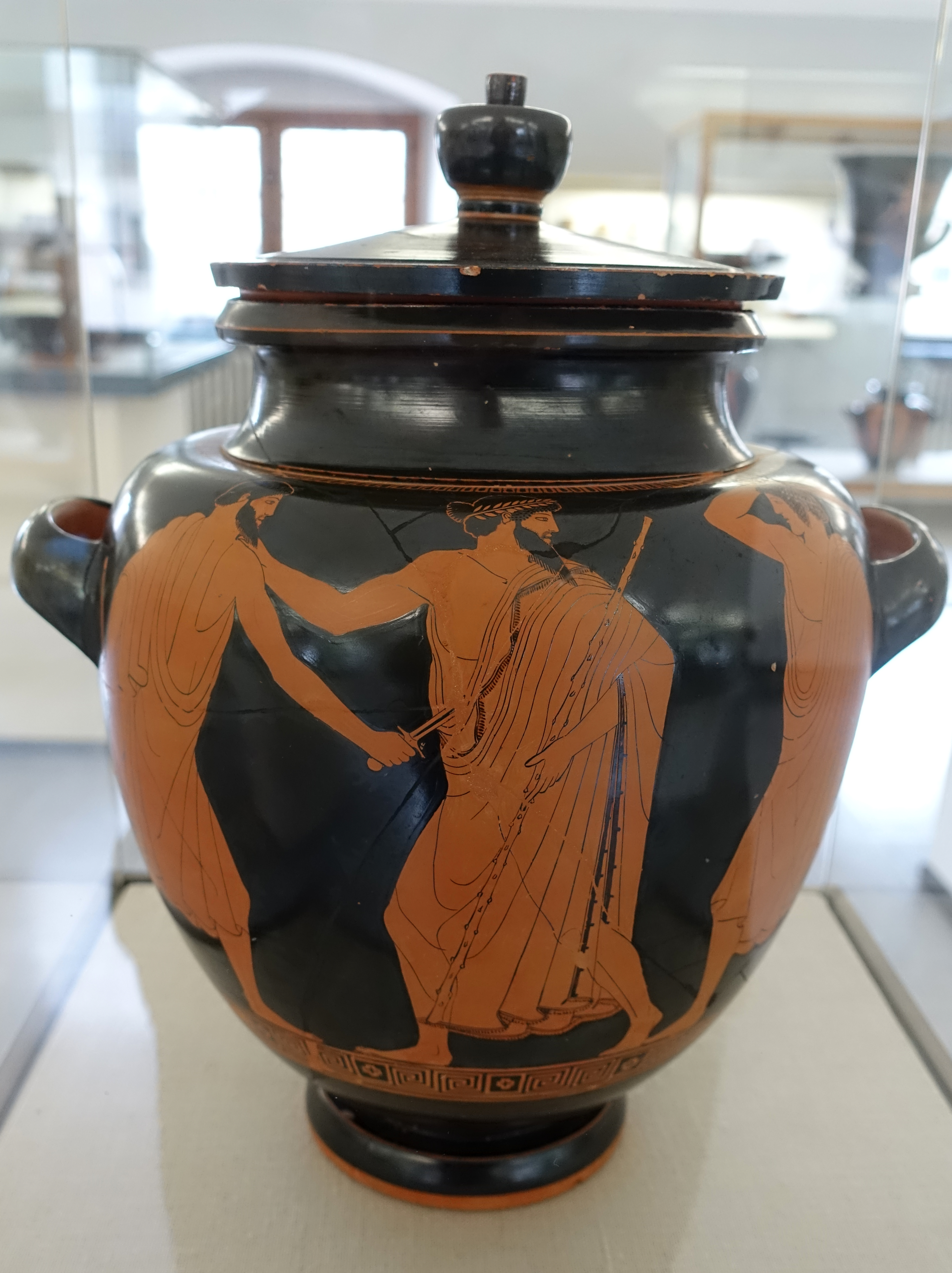
- Death of the tyrant Hipparchus, by the Syriskos Painter, 475–470 BC
- Died: 514 BC
- Parent: Pisistratus

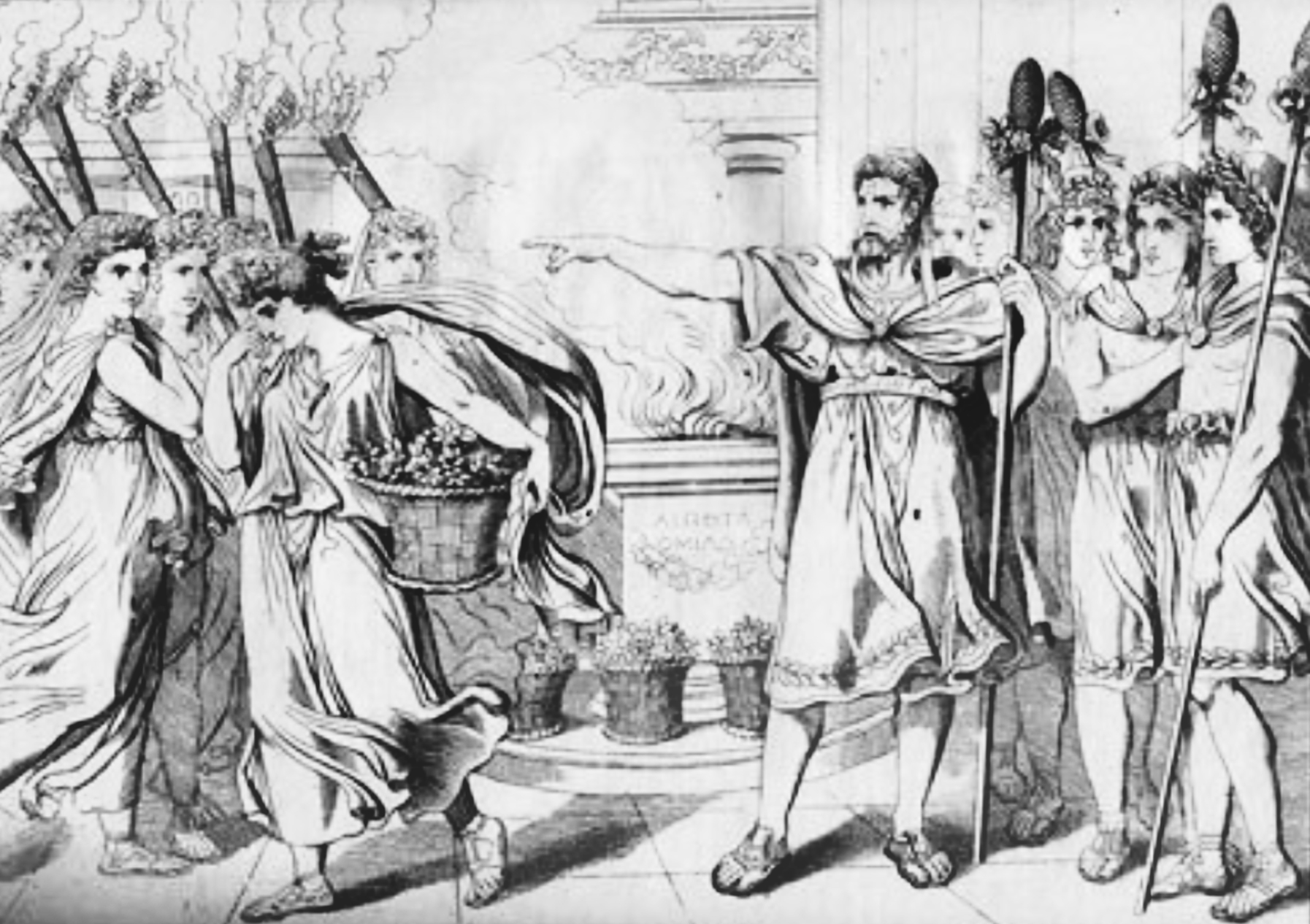
Hypparchus insults Harmodius's sister in public

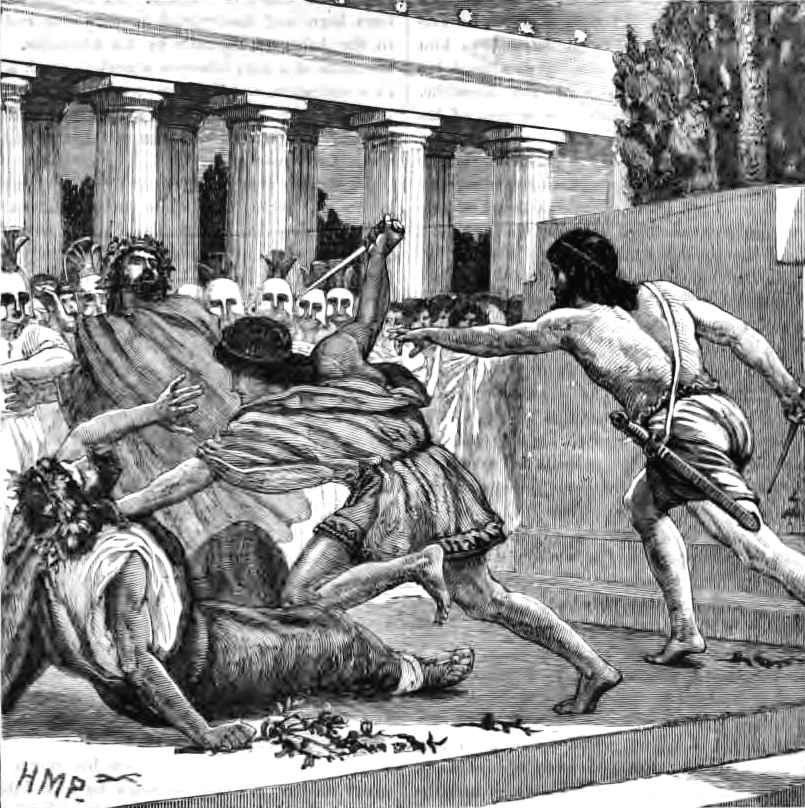
A depiction of the assassination of Hipparchus

Hipparchus (Ancient Greek: Ἵππαρχος, romanized: Hípparkhos; died 514 BC) was a member of the ruling class of Athens and one of the sons of Pisistratus. He was a tyrant of the city of Athens from 528/527 BC until his assassination by the tyrannicides Harmodius and Aristogeiton in 514 BC.

== Life ==
Hipparchus was said by some Greek authors to have been the tyrant of Athens, along with his brother Hippias, after the death of their father Peisistratos in about 528/7 BC. The word tyrant refers to a ruler who usurped power illegitimately, as opposed to a ruler who inherited a monarchy. According to Thucydides, Hippias was the only 'tyrant'. Both Hipparchus and his father Pisistratus enjoyed the popular support of the people. Hipparchus was a patron of the arts; it was he who invited Simonides of Ceos to Athens.

In 514 BC, Hipparchus was assassinated by the tyrannicides, Harmodius and Aristogeiton. This was a personal dispute according to Herodotus and Thucydides. Hipparchus had fallen in love with Harmodius, who was already the lover of Aristogeiton. Not only did Harmodius reject him, but humiliated him by telling Aristogeiton of his advances. Hipparchus then invited Harmodius's sister to participate in the Panathenaic Festival as kanephoros only to publicly disqualify her on the grounds that she was not a virgin. Harmodius and Aristogeiton then organized a revolt for the Panathenaic Games but they panicked and attacked too early. Although they killed Hipparchus, Harmodius was killed by his bodyguard and Aristogeiton was arrested, tortured, and later killed.

After the assassination of his brother, Hippias is said to have become a bitter and cruel tyrant, and was overthrown a few years later in 510 BC by the Spartan king Cleomenes I.
