= Vouliagmeni =

Vouliagmeni Βουλιαγμένη
- Municipal unit
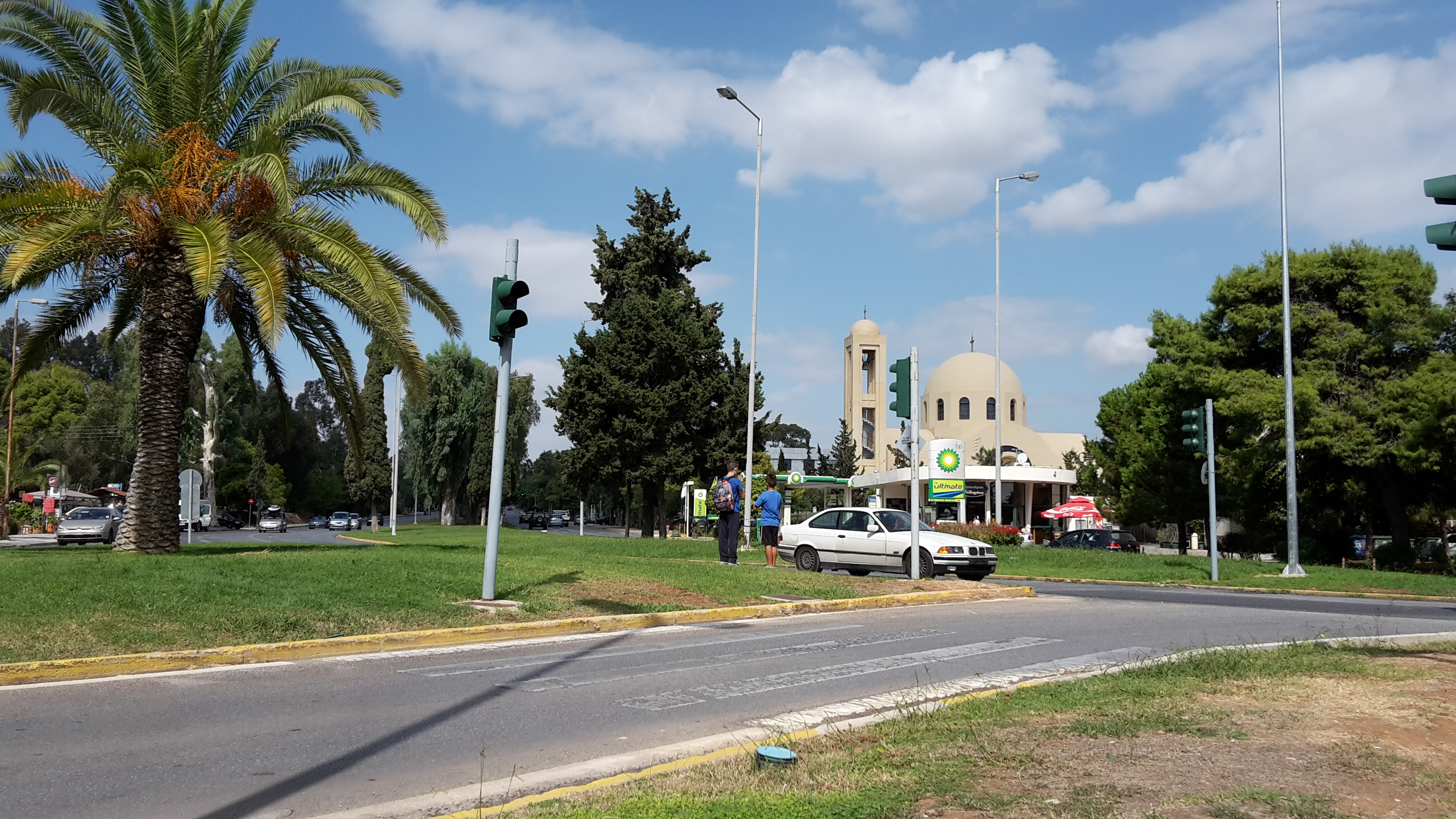
- Vouliagmeni, 2014

- Location within the regional unit

- Location within Greece
- Coordinates: 37°48′N 23°47′E
- Country: Greece
- Administrative region: Attica
- Regional unit: East Attica
- Municipality: Vari-Voula-Vouliagmeni

Area
  - Municipal unit: 5.805 km^{2} (2.241 sq mi)
- Elevation: 18 m (59 ft)

Population (2021)
  - Municipal unit: 4,332
  - Municipal unit density: 746.3/km^{2} (1,933/sq mi)
- Time zone: UTC+2 (EET)
  - Summer (DST): UTC+3 (EEST)
- Postal code: 166 xx
- Area code: 210
- Vehicle registration: ΖΧ

Vouliagmeni (Greek: Βουλιαγμένη, meaning "sunken") is a seaside suburb and former municipality 18 km south of Athens city centre. Since the 2011 local government reform it has been part of the municipality Vari-Voula-Vouliagmeni, of which it is a municipal unit. The municipal unit has an area of 5.805 km^{2}. Its population was 4,332 at the 2021 census. In 1993 and again in 2009, it hosted the annual meeting of the Bilderberg Group. The suburb is named after Lake Vouliagmeni, located in its vicinity. It is one of the most prestigious Athenian suburbs, home to renowned hotels and beaches. The area has some of the highest real estate prices in the Mediterranean.

== Geography ==
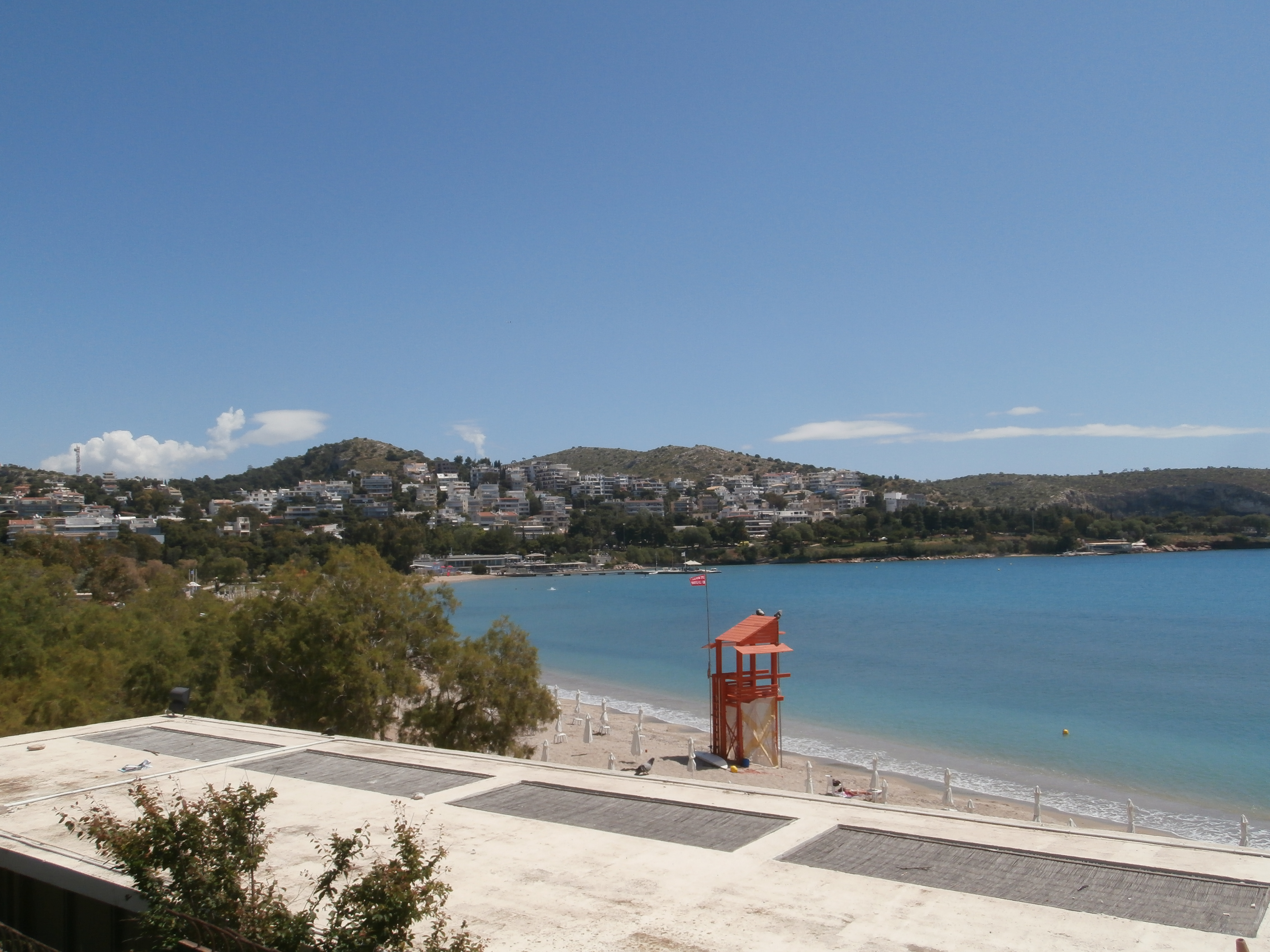
Beach in Vouliagmeni

Vouliagmeni sits on the southwestern foot of the Hymettus mountain range. It is bisected by a palm tree lined boulevard, Athinas Avenue, which arrives from Athens city centre as Vouliagmenis Avenue, then runs parallel to the seashore and continues southwards. The area east of the main road is the rocky slope of a foothill of Mount Hymettus, and the bulk of the town is built there, along with the local elementary school, post office, banks and town hall.

The western half, located between Athinas Avenue and the sea, is covered with pine trees and consists of two peninsulas, Megalo and Mikro Kavouri ("Big Crab" and "Little Crab") that feature sandy and pebble beaches in between rocky shores, luxury hotels (including the Astir Palace Hotel occupying most of Mikro Kavouri), the local high school, the picturesque chapel of "St. George of the crab", two marinas, an aquatic sports club (the "Nautical Club of Vouliagmeni", see below), a sports club (soccer, basketball, volleyball, tennis) and upscale restaurants, taverns and cafeterias on the waterfront.

The Mikro Kavouri is connected to the mainland with a narrow, sandy isthmus commonly referred to as "Laimos" (λαιμός, i.e. the "Neck"), flanked by one public beach on one side and Astir Palace beach on the other side. The Megalo Kavouri is land largely owned by the Church of Greece, which maintains an enclosed, protected pine forest and an orphanage. An air force camp is also located there. Dotted with lavish villas, the two Kavouri areas are among the most expensive pieces of housing real estate in Greece.

The Vouliagmeni beaches are consistently awarded the coveted EU blue flags for environmental excellence. The triathlon competition for the 2004 Summer Olympics took place in this area. The small, rocky islet of Fleves lies off shore.

== History ==
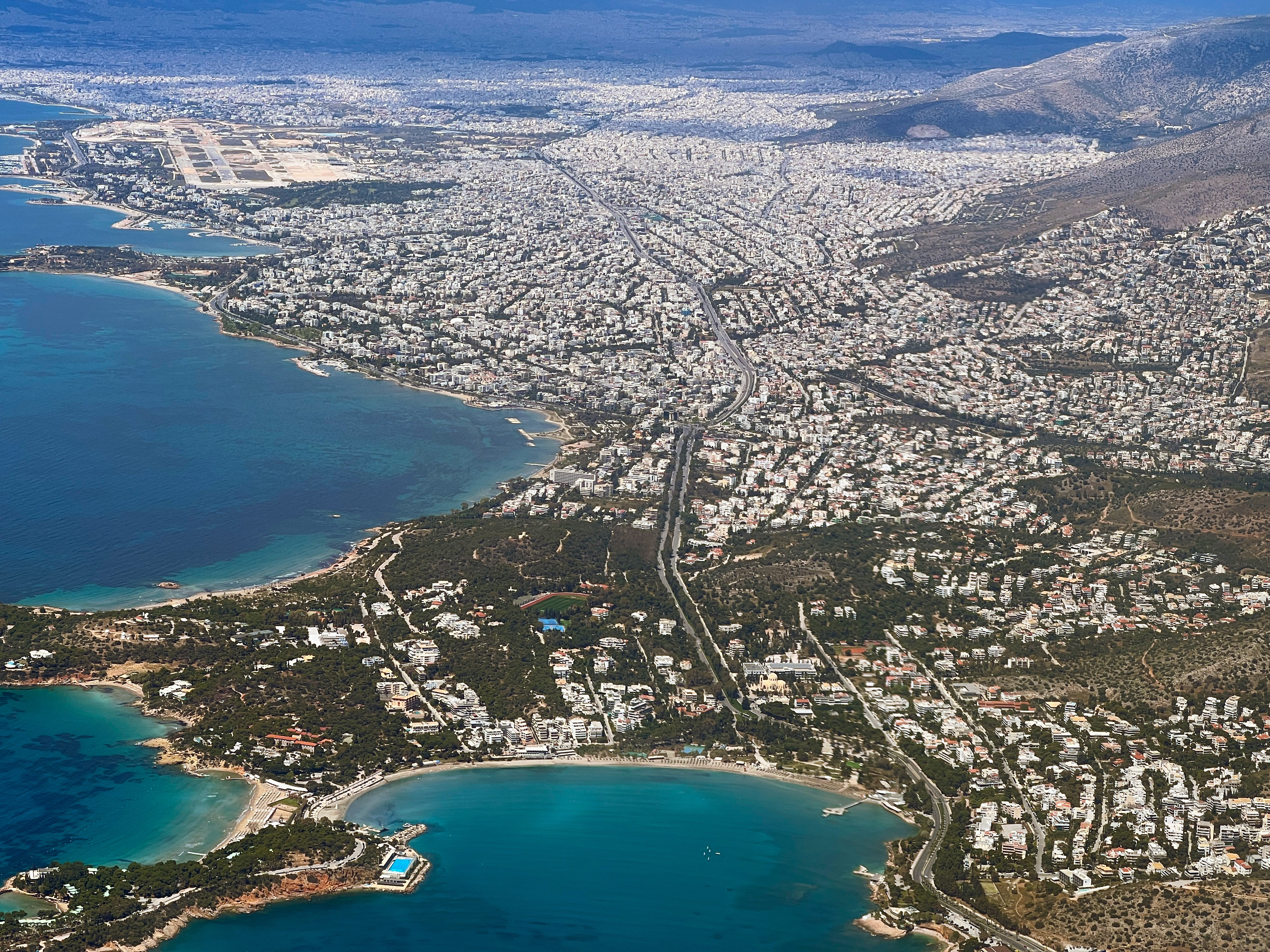
Aerial view of Vouliagmeni

Ruins of the Temple of Apollo Zoster have been excavated and can be viewed inside the public Astir Hotel beach. According to legend, when Leto was about to give birth to Apollo and Artemis, she fled writhing in pain to Delos. During her flight she discarded her girdle, which fell on the Mikro Kavouri peninsula. When her son, the god Apollo, was born, he picked up the discarded girdle and girdled himself in honour of his mother, and was hence named "Zoster" (Girt). Other remnants of early human habitation found in Vouliagmeni include Neolithic and Bronze Age building foundations, and a 5th-century BC outpost. In classical times the area was the Athenian deme of Aixōnídes Halaí (Greek: Αἰξωνίδες Ἁλαί), i.e. the Saltfields of Aixōnē (modern day Glyfada). The deme's citizens were called Ἁλαεῖς, Halaeīs.

== Nautical Club of Vouliagmeni ==
The Nautical Club of Vouliagmeni, or "NOV" (Greek: Ναυτικός Όμιλος Βουλιαγμένης, "NOB") was founded by local sportsmen in 1937 and is located on the eastern edge of the Mikro Kavouri, adjacent to the Astir Palace Hotel and overlooking the bay, town and lake. The club admits members and their guests and operates a marina, a waterskiing school, junior and Olympic competition sailing boats and facilities, an open-air, heated swimming pool, two rocky beaches, members' indoor and outdoor lounges, a gym, and a restaurant. The pool hosts swimming, finswimming, synchronized swimming and water polo teams, and the respective training schools for children. The women's and men's water polo teams are considered a traditional force in European water polo and have won many Greek and several European Championships and Cups. The club often hosts LEN Euroleague and LEN Cup tournaments, its star players consistently being capped for the Greece men's national water polo team and Greece women's national water polo team. The club crest depicts a blue anchor set inside a white lifebuoy with eight crimson stripes; blue, white, and crimson being the club colors.

== Lake Vouliagmeni ==
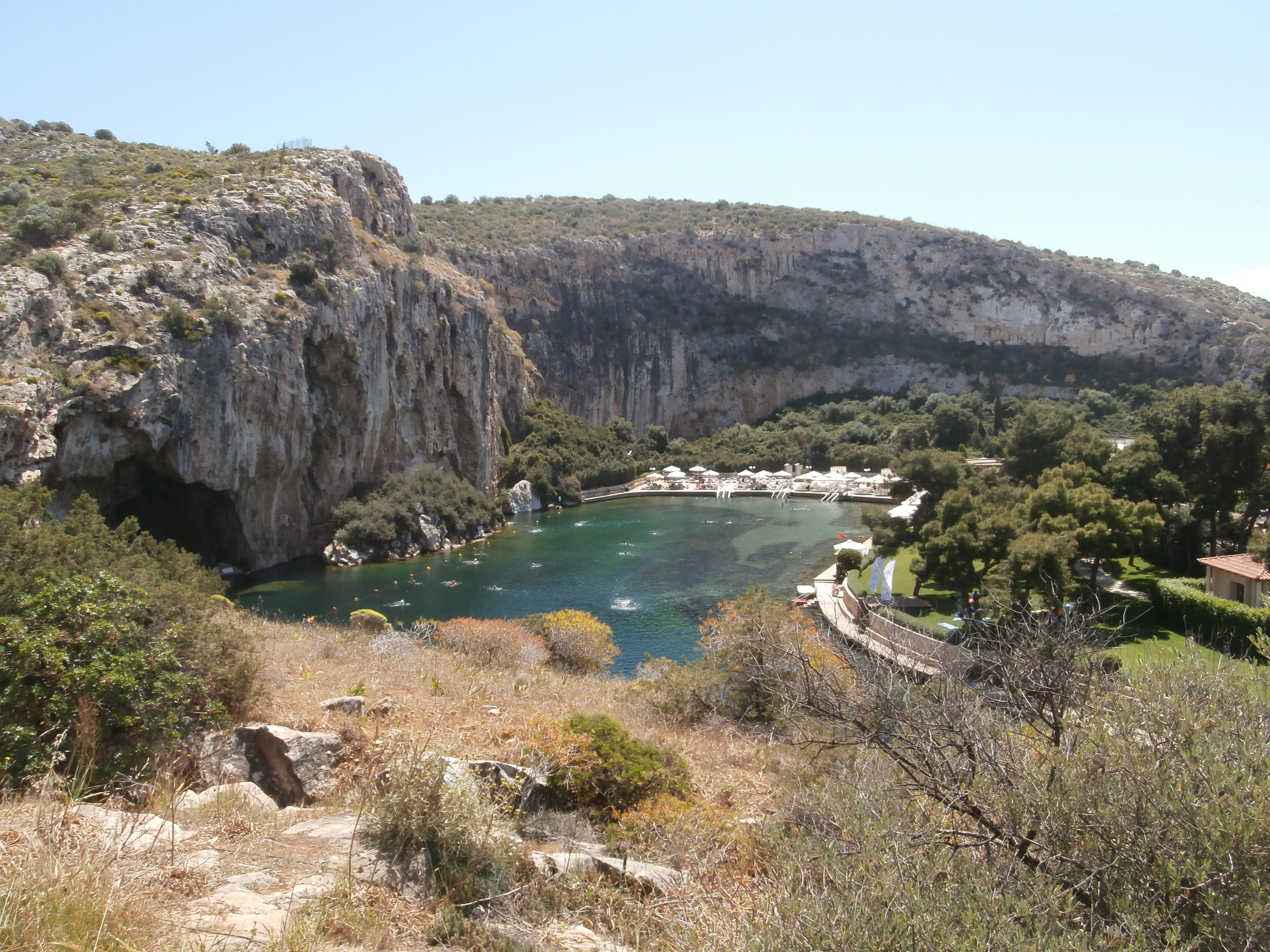
View of the Lake Vouliagmeni

Immediately to the south of town and very close to the sea, a rare geological formation is to be found that gave the suburb its modern name: Lake Vouliagmeni ("Sunken Lake"), a small brackish-water lake fed by underground currents seeping through the mass of Mount Hymettus. Because of its comfortable water temperature, ranging from 22 to 29 °Celsius, the lake functions as a year-round spa.

== Historical population ==
Year	Population
1981	2,897
1991	3,450
2001	6,442
2011	4,180
2021	4,332

== Notable residents ==
Greek businessperson Chrysanthos Panas was raised in Vouliagmeni.

Songwriter Bob Dylan stayed in Vouliagmeni in the summer of 1964 composing many of the ballads later recorded for Another Side of Bob Dylan.

World champion tennis player Stefanos Tsitsipas was raised in Vouliagmeni
