= Temple of Apollo Zoster =

Ancient Greek temple in Athens, Greece

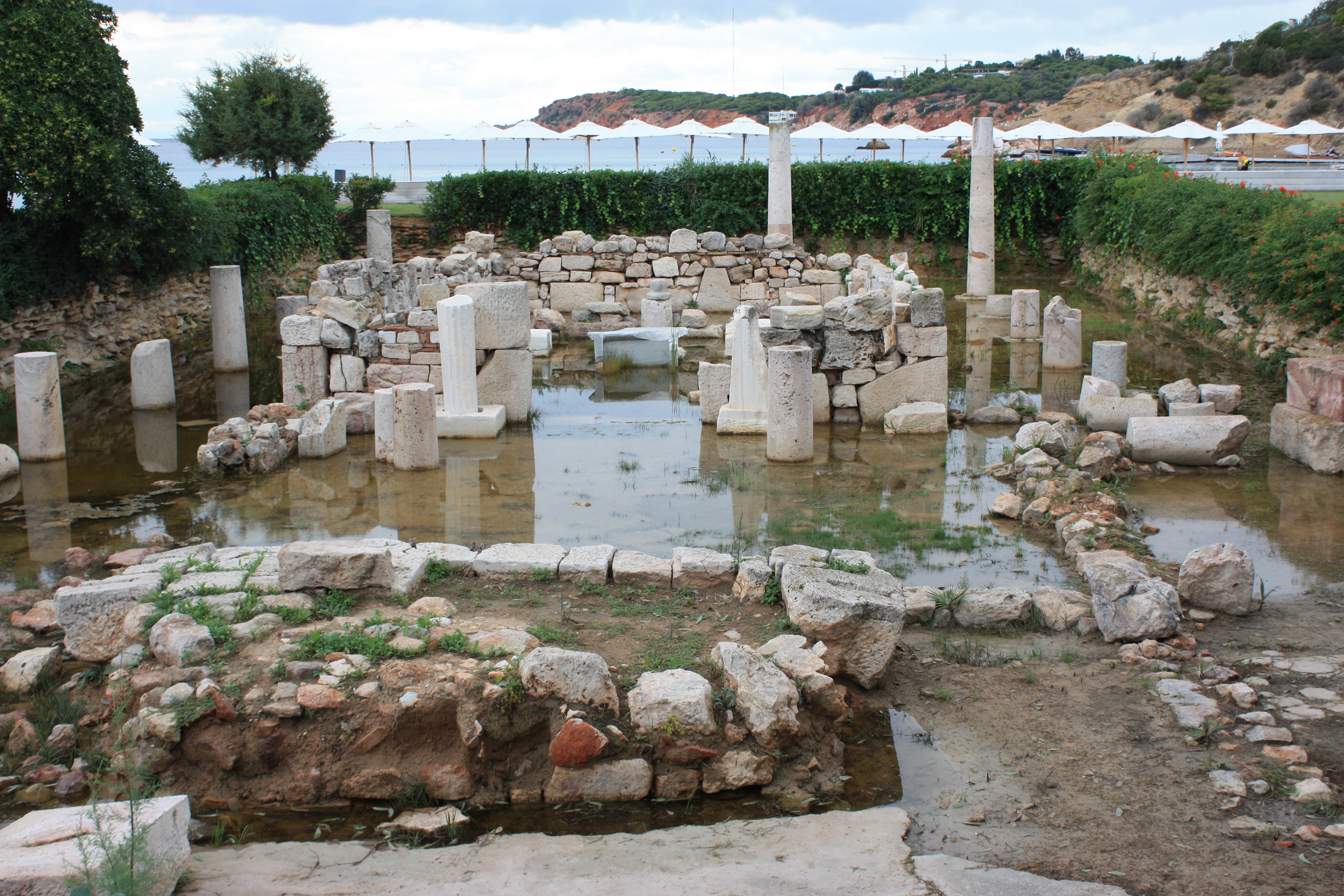
- The Temple of Apollo Zoster before landscaping and drainage works

- Location within Greece
- Type: Temple
- Periods: Archaic Period to Christian era
- Satellite of: Athens
- Location: Vouliagmeni, Athens, Greece
- Region: Attica

Site notes
- Material: Marble
- Length: 10.8 m (35 ft)
- Width: 6 m (20 ft)
- Condition: Ruined
- Owner: Private
- Management: 3rd Ephorate of Prehistoric and Classical Antiquities
- Public access: Yes

The Temple of Apollo Zoster is an ancient Greek temple, the remains of which are located at Vouliagmeni in Athens, Greece.

== Location and discovery ==
The temple was uncovered when children from the Vouliagmeni orphanage were playing on what is now known as the Astir Beach. The site now lies sunken, at the back of the beach, and is surrounded by a lawn and hedges. The temple itself is almost at sea level, and so is often flooded outside the summer months.

The inscriptions found in the ruins confirm that the site is the Temple of Apollo Zoster. Excavations were undertaken by the archaeologists K. Kourouniotes and M. Pittidis during 1926–27. This confirmed references in the ancient literary sources: Pausanias mentions that Zoster was the location of the most important sanctuary of the deme of Aixōnídes Halaí (Greek: Αἰξωνίδες Ἁλαί), in other words, the Saltfields of Aixōnē. This ancient deme included the modern areas of Voula and Vouliagmeni.

The temple sits on the middle tongue of a three-tongued promontory which was once famously known in antiquity as Cape Zoster. Herodotus writes that, after the battle of Salamis, the Persians mistook the rocks of the headland for Greek ships.

== History ==
Pausanias believed that in this location Leto, who was pregnant by Zeus, loosened her gilt belt, or zoster, as she was being chased by an angry Hera. Leto believed that she was about to give birth to the twins known as Apollo and Artemis.

Pausanias described it in the 2nd century:

At Zoster (Girdle) [in Attika] on the coast is an altar to Athena, as well as to Apollon, to Artemis and to Leto. The story is that Leto did not give birth to her children here, but loosened her girdle with a view to her delivery, and the place received its name from this incident.

The Temple was founded in the sixth century BC, the Archaic Period. It is of rectangular construction, 10.8m by 6.00m, and has a sekos and an adyton. The floor of the Temple "is a unique and fine construction of big, rectangular slabs."

The sekos is separated from the adyton by a wall which was built in a later phase, in the fourth century BC. Inside the sekos are preserved:

- Three bases on which the cult statues of Leto, Apollo and Artemis were standing. Two of the bases preserve the carved inscriptions "HALAIES ANETHESAN". This means that the citizens of the deme of Halai Axonides offered these statues to the worshipped deities.
- The marble throne of the Temple's priest.
- The marble altar bearing an inscription that refers to the repair of the temple during the fourth century BC, when Polystratos was priest of the temple.

The peristyle was added during the fourth century BC, comprising a colonnade around the temple, which consisted of four columns along the narrow sides of the Temple, and six columns along the longer side of the Temple.

In front of the Temple stands the base of a large rectangular altar measuring 4.25m by 2.25m. At the north-east end of the Temple is a square two-stepped base on which a votive statue probably stood.

During the Christian period, after the Persecution of pagans in the late Roman Empire, the walls of the sekos were prolonged, some repairs took place, and the temple was transformed into a Christian church.

== Priest’s House ==
There is an attendant building of the same period, later enlarged, discovered in 1936 and comprising the priest's house or a pilgrim's hostel.

== Gallery ==
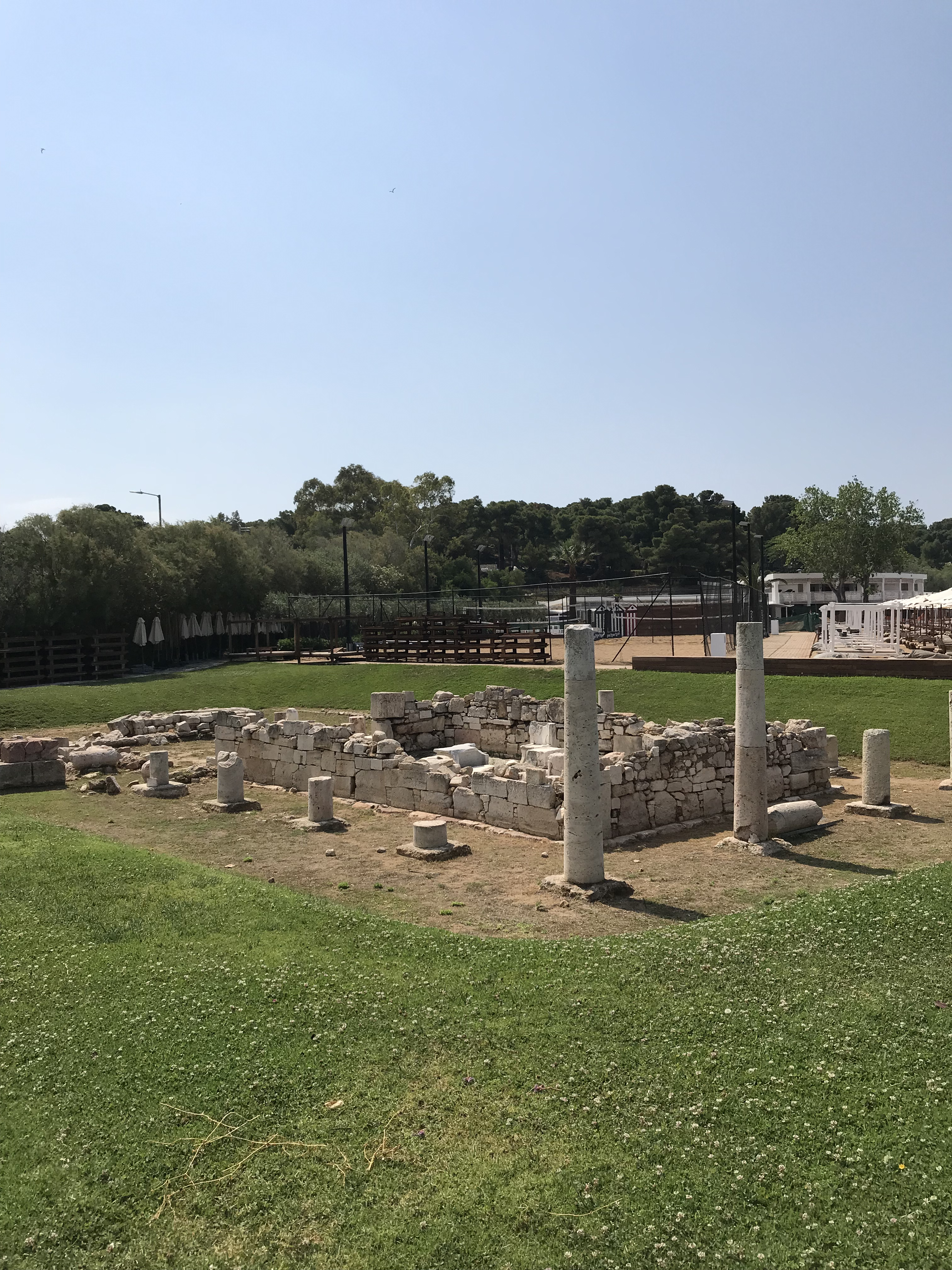
The Temple of Apollo Zoster after landscaping and drainage works, Vouliagmeni, Attica

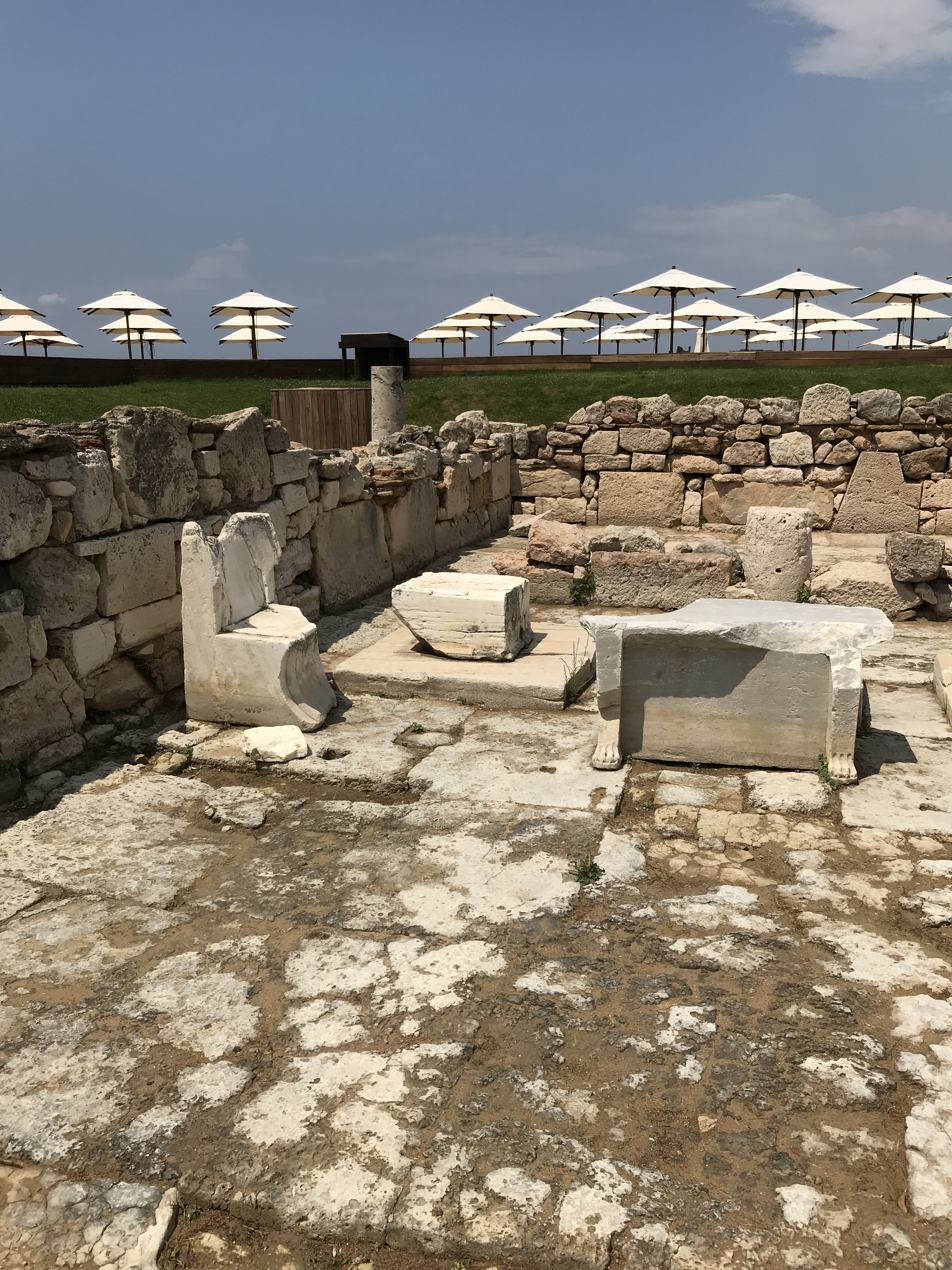
View of the sekos, Temple of Apollo Zoster

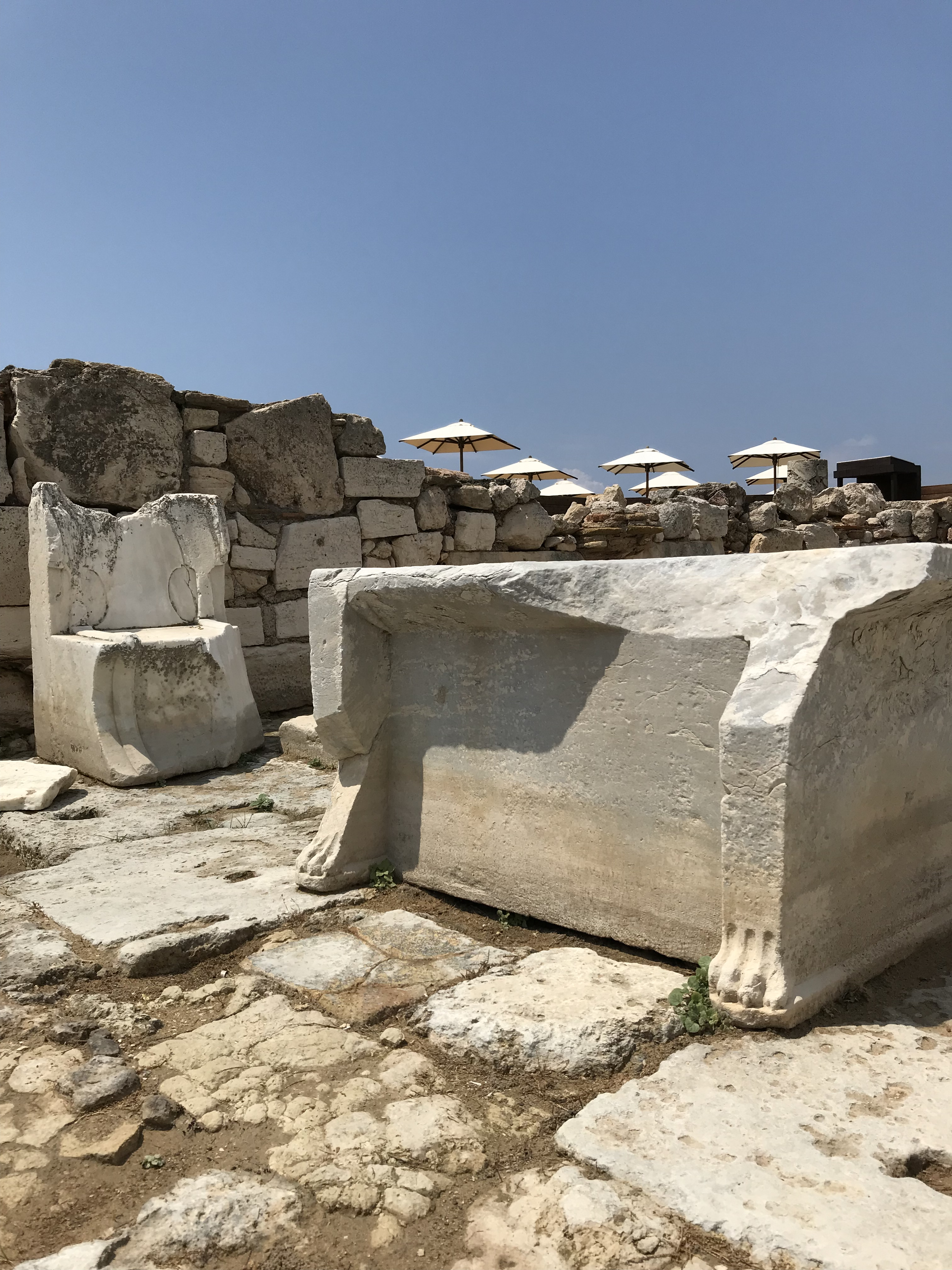
Marble altar, Temple of Apollo Zoster

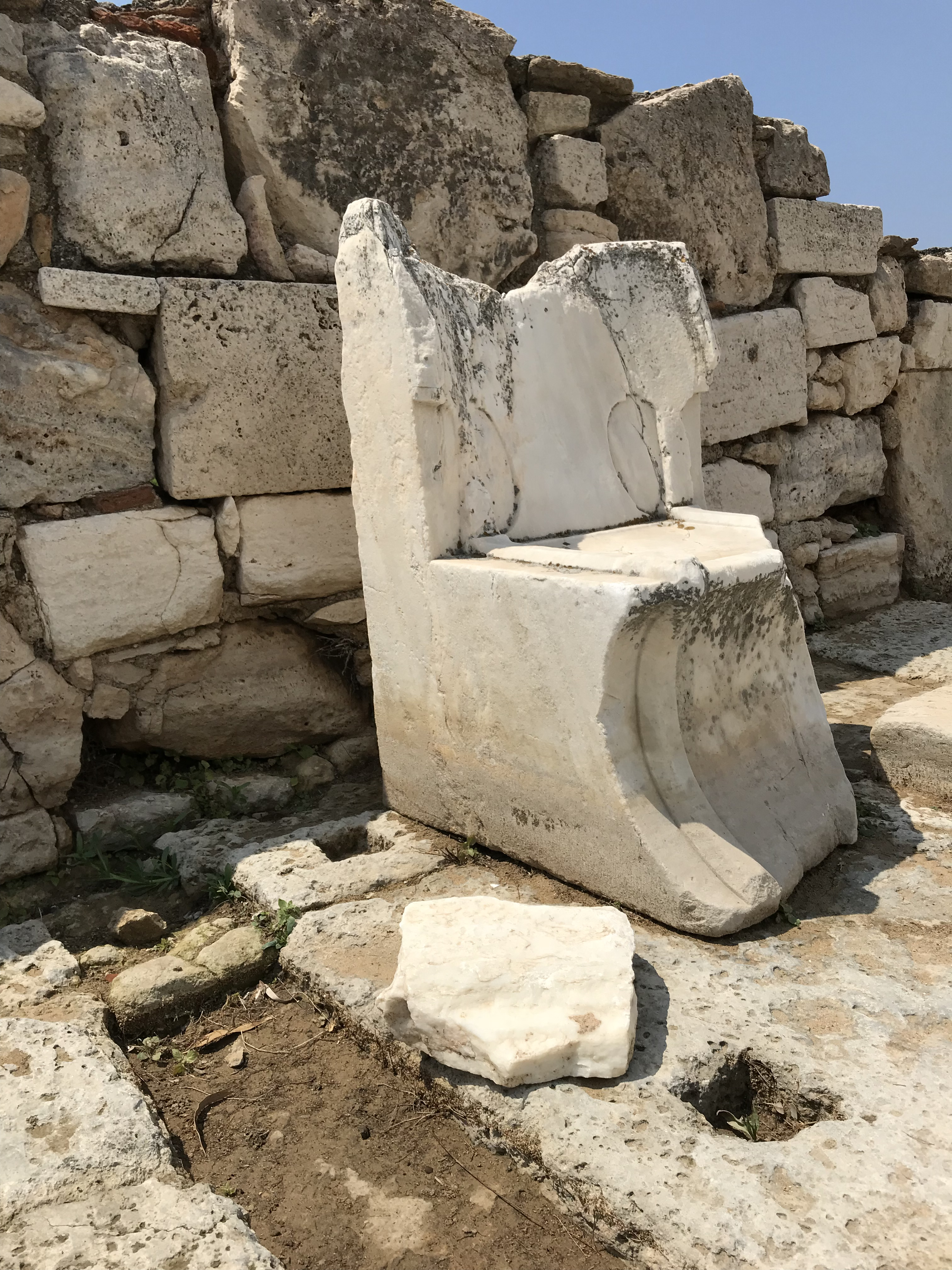
Marble throne of the priest, Temple of Apollo Zoster

== See also ==
- List of Ancient Greek temples
