= Halae Aexonides =

Coordinates: 37°51′08″N 23°46′12″E

Halae Aexonides or Halai Aixonides (Ancient Greek: Ἁλαὶ Αἰξωνίδες), also known as Aexonides Halae or Aixonides Halai (Αἰξωνίδες Ἁλαί), was a deme of ancient Attica, a little south of Aexone. It derived its name from its salt-works. Its surname distinguishes it from Halae Araphenides. Its most important sanctuary was Temple of Apollo Zoster, ruins of which remain in modern Vouliagmeni.

The site of Halae Aexonides is located at the Palaichori near Voula (and Vouliagmeni).
