= American College of Greece =

Private, non-profit, American-accredited college in Greece

The American College of Greece
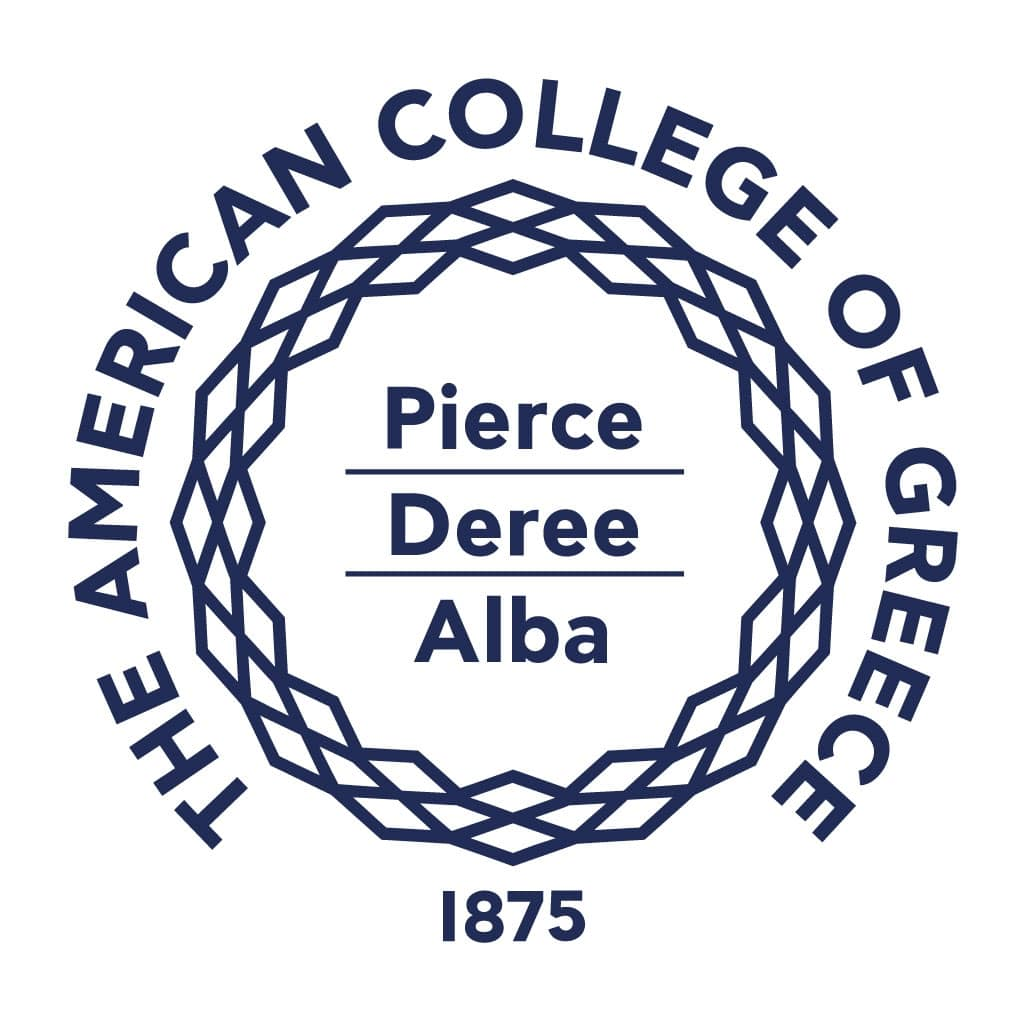
- Motto: Non Ministrari, Sed Ministrare (Latin)
- Motto in English: Not to be Served, but to Serve
- Type: Private, co-educational elementary, secondary school, college, graduate school
- Established: 1875 (151 years ago) Smyrna
- Affiliations: NECHE; AAICU; Open University UK; AMBA; MSA accreditation
- President: Edward C. Wingenbach
- Location: Agia Paraskevi, North Athens, Attica, Greece; 38.0025°N 23.8295°E
- Campus: Agia Paraskevi campus, Spata East campus, downtown Athens campus
- Nickname: ACG
- Mascot: Griffin
- Website: www.acg.edu

The American College of Greece (ACG) is a private college, graduate business school, and primary and high school in Agia Paraskevi, Greece

== History ==
ACG was founded in Smyrna (currently İzmir, Turkey), in Ottoman Empire in 1875 as a school for girls by United Church of Christ American missionaries. The first Dean was Minnie Mills. The school relocated to Athens in 1923 after the Greco-Turkish War and the population exchange. It became co-educational in 1932 and changed its name to The American College of Greece in 1962. It was relocated to Hellenikon, Athens, after the loss of Asia minor to the Turks at the invitation of then Prime Minister of Greece Eleftherios Venizelos. During the Axis occupation of Greece, its premises were used as a hospital under German command. After the war, the college reopened at Hellenikon, where it remained until it moved to its new campus in the Athens suburb of Agia Paraskevi, where it operates to this day

Undergraduate and graduate studies are based on the 64-acre main campus in Aghia Paraskevi. Another campus, East Campus, is in Spata and serves pre-K and elementary students. Alba Graduate Business School is in downtown Athens.

John S. Bailey served as president from 1975 to 2008. David G. Horner was the president from 2008 till June 30, 2025. He was succeeded by Edward C. Wingenbach. The college is governed by a board of trustees.

In 2025, faculty at the college who have cooperated with authorities of Israel came under heavy criticism for failing to recognize Israel's part in the Gaza genocide whilst continuing this cooperation.In August 2025, Deree's administration was forced to cancel a project involving an educational visit to Israel after receiving heavy criticism from their own students. Later in the same month, the college was criticized for hosting The Annual Conference of the European Society of Criminology (EUROCRIM 2025), organized by the European Society of Criminology, because Israeli universities were invited by the organizer. Panteion University retracted its auspices along with the Athens Municipality . The college received attention from the Boycott, Divestment and Sanctions movement. There was a protest outside the college's premises on the opening day of the conference.

== Academics ==
ACG comprises three academic divisions: Deree, the undergraduate and graduate division; Alba Graduate Business School, the graduate business school; and Pierce, the primary & secondary education division.

=== Pierce ===
Pierce was founded in Smyrna (modern day İzmir) in 1875. It was initially situated in Palaio Faliro, a suburb in the southern Athens and later on in Elliniko, in the area where the old Athens Airport was. In 1963 it moved to Aghia Paraskevi suburb in north-eastern Athens. The school was for girls only until 1982 when it became co-educational. Until 2021 it had only a gymnasium & lyceum, based in Aghia Paraskevi. From 2022, a new campus (East Campus) opened in Spata and it currently houses Pre-K to 12 Grade.

As of November 2022 the school was accredited by Middle States Association – Commissions on Elementary and Secondary Schools, MSA-CESS. As of Fall 2023, it enrolls approximately 2.000 students.

=== Deree ===
Deree was named after Socrates Derehanis who was a benefactor. It offers 38 undergraduate programs in Business & Economics, Liberal Arts & Fine Arts. It also operates a Graduate School which offers 9 master programs. It enrolls ~5,000 students as of Fall 2023. The school is accredited by New England Commission of Higher Education. Open University UK is a partner institution and accredits the degrees of Deree. In February 2026, Deree in collaboration with Roger Williams University applied for a University Legal Entity license, as per law 5094 of 2024.. On July 24th 2026, the Ministry of Education granted the license for Deree - The American University of Greece University Legal Entity.

=== Alba ===
Alba Graduate Business school was created in 1992 through a joint initiative of the Federation of Greek Industries (ΣΕΒ) and the Hellenic Management Association (ΕΕΔΕ). It merged with The American College of Greece in 2011. It offers 9 MSc programs, an MBA, an Executive MBA and an Online MBA course. It is accredited by AACSB and Association of MBAs. As of fall 2023 it has approximately 500 students enrolled.

== Notable alumni ==
- Chrysanthos Panas - Greek businessman, art collector, and philanthropist; graduate of Deree.
- Sofia Papaioannou - Greek jouralist and Television presenter; graduate of Deree.
- Reza Shirmarz - Iranian widely published, award-winning and internationally recognized playwright, translator, scholar and researcher; graduate of Deree.
- Miranda Xafa - Greek economist and former member of the Executive Board of the International Monetary Fund; graduate of the American College of Greece.
