= Halimus =

Ancient Athenian deme

Coordinates: 37°54′22″N 23°43′56″E

Halimus or Halimous (Ancient Greek: Ἁλιμοῦς, Latin: Halmius) was a deme of ancient Athens, said to have been so called from τὰ ἅλιμα, sea-weeds, was situated on the coast between Phalerum and Aexone, at the distance of 35 stadia from the city of Athens. It had temples of Demeter and Core, and of Heracles. Halimus was the deme of Thucydides the historian.

The site of Halimus is located north of modern Ag. Kosmas. Modern Alimos.
