= Chrysanthos Panas =

Greek businessman

- Born: 16 November 1968 (age 57); Athens, Greece
- Occupation: Businessman

Chrysanthos Panas (Greek: Χρύσανθος Πανάς; born 16 November 1968) is a Greek businessman, art collector, author of Greek Islands book by Assouline, member of the Intangible Cultural Heritage committee of the Greek National Committee of UNESCO and philanthropist from Athens. In his native country, he is mainly known in the hospitality sector as the owner of Island Resort, located on the Athens Riviera, which includes villas and bungalows, fine-dining restaurants, a world-class club, event spaces, beaches with crystal-clear waters and a floating dock to welcome guests arriving by yacht. Additionally, he is the owner of the historic restaurant Athénée in the city center of Athens, a renowned venue known for its exceptional cuisine, refined aesthetics and cultural heritage. Panas Group also owns the Foyer of the Pallas Theatre, an elegant space in the heart of Athens.

== Biography ==
Panas was born in 1968 in Athens, Greece and grew up in the seaside suburb of Vouliagmeni. He is a descendant of the noble Panas family of Cephalonia which origins are traced back to the 16th century. A graduate of Deree the American College of Greece (Bachelor's Degree), Panas is married to jewelry designer Elena Syraka and he is father of one child, the artist Lil Koni.

== Business career ==
Chrysanthos Panas started his involvement in business at a young age along with his older brother Spyros, when they took over the management of a beach bar within Nautical Club of Vouliagmeni facilities. Later in 1992 the two siblings founded the Panas Group Sophisticated Hospitality. Over the years, Panas Group got the ownership and management of various restaurants and clubs in the greater Athens region.

== Other activities ==
Starting in 1990, Panas managed to acquire an art collection of over 300 artworks of various artists including Marina Abramović, Stephen Antonakos, George Bouzianis, and Thomas Helbig. He is also a member of the Advisory Committee concerning Artistic Issues of Michael Cacoyannis Foundation.

Since 2016 he is a donor to the Greek charitable organization ELEPAP-Rehabilitation for The Disabled (Greek: ΕΛΕΠΑΠ). In 2018 he was awarded by the president of Elpida Association of Friends of Children with Cancer, Marianna Vardinogiannis for supporting children with neoplastic disease.
