= Miranda Xafa =

Greek economist

Miranda Xafa (Greek: Μιράντα Ξαφά, pronounced [miˈranda ksaˈfa]) is a Greek economist, formerly Greece's representative at the IMF Executive Board and chief economic adviser to the Prime Minister of Greece, and currently CEO of an Athens-based advisory firm. She is also a senior fellow at the Centre for International Governance Innovation.

== Education ==
After graduating from the American College of Greece in 1974, she enrolled in the University of Pennsylvania where she received a Master's and a Ph.D. in Economics.

== Career ==
Xafa started working for the International Monetary Fund in Washington in 1980, where she focused on economic stabilization programs in Latin America. Following the center-right New Democracy party win in the 1990 general elections in Greece, Xafa was appointed in 1991 chief economic advisor to prime minister Konstantinos Mitsotakis.

Following the party's defeat in the 1993 legislative elections, Xafa worked as a financial-market analyst at Salomon Brothers/Citigroup in London, UK. In the period 2004–09, she served as a member of the board of the IMF in Washington D.C., representing countries such as Italy, Greece, and Portugal, and subsequently worked as senior investment strategist and member of the advisory board of I.J. Partners in Geneva, Switzerland.

She is currently CEO of an Athens-based advisory firm, and a senior fellow at the Centre for International Governance Innovation.

== Academia ==
Xafa has taught economics at the University of Pennsylvania and at Princeton University. She has authored articles on international finance, the Latin American debt crisis, European monetary unification. and sovereign debt restructuring. She is currently a senior scholar at the Center for International Governance Innovation, where she focuses on the Eurozone economy.

== Views ==
Xafa supports the austerity measures undertaken by various governments in Greece and the reform and financial assistance program agreed between Greece and the troika. She is a supply sider.

She has publicly denounced the "magician's tricks" that ostensibly "beautified" Greece's state finances and economic ratios at the time of the country joining the Eurozone, as well as any attempt at Grexit. She has called on Greek governments to close down the Greek state's defense manufacturing industries because "they are operating at a financial loss." In the 2010s, she joined the "free market", "pro-business" Drassi ("Action") party, serving on its executive committee.

== Selected works ==
- Economides, Spyros, ed. (2017). "Back from the brink: How to end Greece's seemingly interminable crisis" (PDF). Greece: Modernisation and Europe 20 Years on. London School of Economics: 46–53.
- Christodoulakis, George, ed. (2014). "Chapter 5: The 2012 Greek Debt Restructuring and its Aftermath" (PDF). Managing Risks in the European Periphery Debt Crisis: Lessons from the Trade-off between Economics, Politics and the Financial Markets. Palgrave Macmillan. pp. 87–100. ISBN 978-1137304940.
- "Role of the IMF in the Global Financial Crisis" (PDF). Cato Journal. 30 (3): 46–53. Fall 2010.
- Xafa, Miranda (2007). "Global imbalances and financial stability". Journal of Policy Modeling. 29 (5): 783–796. doi:10.1016/j.jpolmod.2007.06.012. S2CID 154605304.
- «Lessons from the 2012 Greek Debt Restructuring», CIGI Paper No 32, June 201
- «EU Bank Resolution Post-Cyprus», Cayman Financial Review, July 12, 2013. Available at https://www.mirandaxafa.com/mediaupload/pdf/eu_bank_resolution_post_cyprus.pdf
- «The IMF’s Lending Framework and Sovereign Debt Restructuring», CIGI Commentary, July 2014 https://www.cigionline.org/publications/imfs-lending-framework-and-sovereign-debt-restructuring/
- «European Banking Union, Three Years on», CIGI Paper No 73, June 2015 https://www.cigionline.org/publications/european-banking-union-three-years
- «European Banking Supervision: The First 18 Months», in D. Schoenmaker and N. Veron, editors, Bruegel blueprint, June 2016 http://bruegel.org/2016/06/blueprint-european-banking-supervision-the-first-eighteen-months/
- «Playing with Matches in the Ammunition Warehouse» CIGI Policy Brief No 100, March 2017 https://www.cigionline.org/publications/greece-playing-matches-ammunition-warehouse
- «European Capital Markets Union after Brexit» CIGI Paper No 140, August 2017 https://www.cigionline.org/publications/european-capital-markets-union-post-brexi t
- «Greece’s “Clean Exit” from Third Bailout: A Reality Check» CIGI Policy Brief No 124, March 2018 https://www.cigionline.org/publications/greeces-clean-exit-third-bailout-reality-check
- «Euro area governance reform: The Unfinished Agenda» CIGI Paper No 203, November 2018 https://www.cigionline.org/publications/euro-area-governance-reform-unfinished-agenda
- «A Statistician’s Ordeal: The Case of Andreas Georgiou» World Economics, Vol. 20, No 3, July–September 2019 https://www.worldeconomics.com/Andreas-Georgiou
- Robert Mundell, 1932-2021: Ahead of his Time” Johns Hopkins Institute for Applied Economics, April 2021 https://sites.krieger.jhu.edu/iae/files/2021/04/Robert-Mundell-1932-2021-Ahead-of-his-Time.pdf

== See also ==
- Yanis Varoufakis
