= Thucydides (disambiguation) =

Thucydides (or Thucydides, son of Olorus, circa 460-before 394 BC) a Greek historian and general of ancient Athens.

Thucydides may also refer to:

- Thucydides, son of Melesias (5th century BC), prominent politician of ancient Athens
- Thucydides II, son of Melesias II (4th century), grandson of Thucydides, son of Melesias featured in Plato's Laches
- 10137 Thucydides, a main-belt asteroid, named after the Athenian historian

== See also ==
- Thucydides Trap, where a rising power causes fear in an established power which escalates toward war (e.g. China and the United States), coined by historian by American political scientist Graham Allison after the Athenian historian who had posited that the Peloponnesian War between Athens and Sparta was inevitable because of Spartan fears of the growth of Athenian power
