= Aexone =

Deme of ancient Attica

Coordinates: 37°51′59″N 23°45′18″E

Aexone or Aixone (Ancient Greek: Αἰξωνή) was a deme of ancient Attica situated on the coast south of Halimus. Aixone, along with neighbouring Halai Aixonidai, belonged to the Kekropis tribe. Aexone was celebrated for its fisheries.

The site of Aexone is located at the modern Glyfada.
