= List of ancient Greek monetary standards =

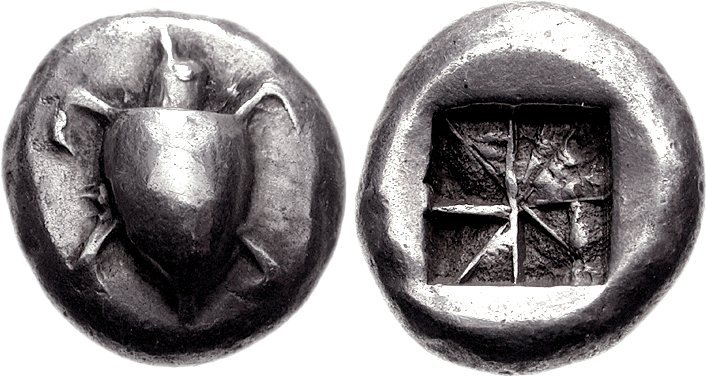
Silver stater of Aegina, 550–530 BC, 12.4 g

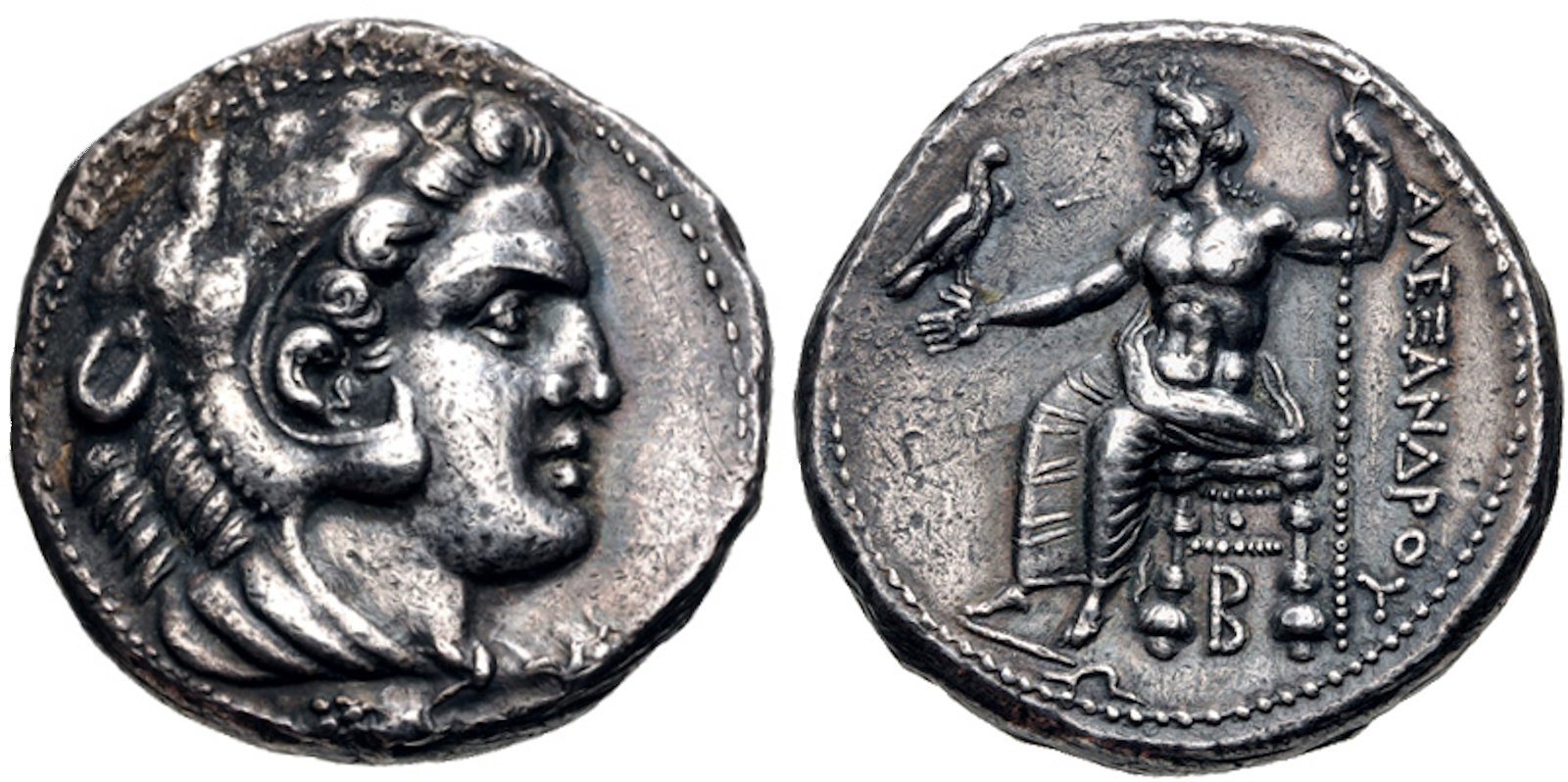
Late lifetime-early posthumous Tetradrachm of Alexander the Great minted in Tarsos on the Attic weight, 17.15 g

A wide variety of different monetary standards were used by different ancient Greek city-states for their silver coinage. These standards differed in the weight of the main monetary unit and also in the denominational structure of the coinage. Modern numismatists have assigned names to these standards, based on the most prominent city-state that minted on them or the region where they are most common.

Each standard was based on a single unit: the most common being a drachm or a stater. All other denominations in the system would be multiples or subdivisions of that unit. In practice individual coins tend to vary from their ideal weights, due to a lack of precision during manufacture and the loss of weight over time through wear.

Some standards were restricted to a few city-states; others, notably the Attic-Euboean standard, became very widespread. Weight standards tended to decline over time, because mints sought to profit by producing coins that were slightly lighter than their nominal weight, and because the weight of new coins was often based on the weight of coins already in circulation, which had lost weight through wear.

Many of these standards derived from systems of weight that existed in individual city-states when they began to use coinage in the sixth and fifth centuries BC. Others arose over time as a result of weight reductions and weight adjustments. Most Greek states had ceased to mint silver coinage by the reign of Augustus, but a few standards continued in use throughout the Principate, like the cistophori.

== List of Standards ==
=== Achaean standard ===
The Achaean standard consisted of a stater of around 8 g, divided into three drachms of 2.6 g and obols of 0.4 g; these weights declined over time. It was first used in the mid-sixth century by the Greek city-states of Sybaris, Metapontum, and Croton, which had been founded in Magna Graecia by Achaeans from the Peloponnese, and it remained one of the main standards in Magna Graecia until the end of coinage following the Roman conquest in the early third century BC.

=== Aeginetan standard ===
The Aeginetan standard, based on the coinage issued by Aegina had a stater of 12.4 g, which was divided into a half-stater or drachma of 6.2 g, a quarter-stater of 3.1 g, and twelve obols of 1.0 g each. This was the main trading standard in the Greek world in the Late Archaic period. In the second half of the sixth century BC, the Aeginetan standard was dominant in the Greek world. It was overshadowed by the Attic standard in the fifth century BC, but continued to be widely used, especially in the Peloponnese, until around 200 BC, when the Reduced Aeginetan or Symmachikon ("Allied") standard was adopted by the Achaean League.

=== Attic standard ===
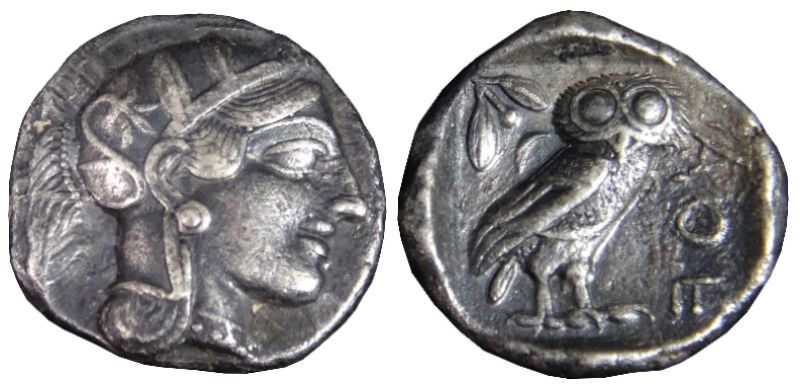
Athens tetradrachm, fifth century BC, 17.2 g (Attic weight)

The Attic standard was the standard issued by Athens from the late sixth century BC onwards. It was based on a drachma of 4.3 g, but in practice the main coin was the tetradrachm of 17.2 g. Each drachma was divided into six obols of 0.72 g. It was interchangeable with the Euboean standard, used by the cities of Euboea and their many colonies throughout the Mediterranean, which was based on a stater of 17.2 g divided into six hectae of 2.86 g and the two are often referred to together as the Attic-Euboean standard. Corinth also used a variant based on a stater of 8.68 g (half an Attic tetradrachm), divided into three units of 2.89 g. In the Classical period, this standard was issued in vast quantities by the Athenian Empire and became the dominant weight standard used for payment of soldiers and for long-distance trade. The use of the standard by the Euboean and Corinthian colonies meant that it also became the dominant standard used in Sicily and northwestern Greece. Philip II of Macedon used the standard for his gold coinage and Alexander the Great used it for silver as well from 333 BC. It remained dominant in the Eastern Mediterranean in the Hellenistic period, when it was issued by Antigonid Macedon, the Seleucid Empire, and many individual city-states. By the Hellenistic period, the Attic standard had dropped to a tetradrachm of 16.8 g and a drachm 4.2 g. In Hellenistic Sicily and Italy, the Attic standard was retained for gold, but silver coinage was reduced repeatedly until it was replaced by the Roman denarius around 211 BC.

=== Chian standard ===
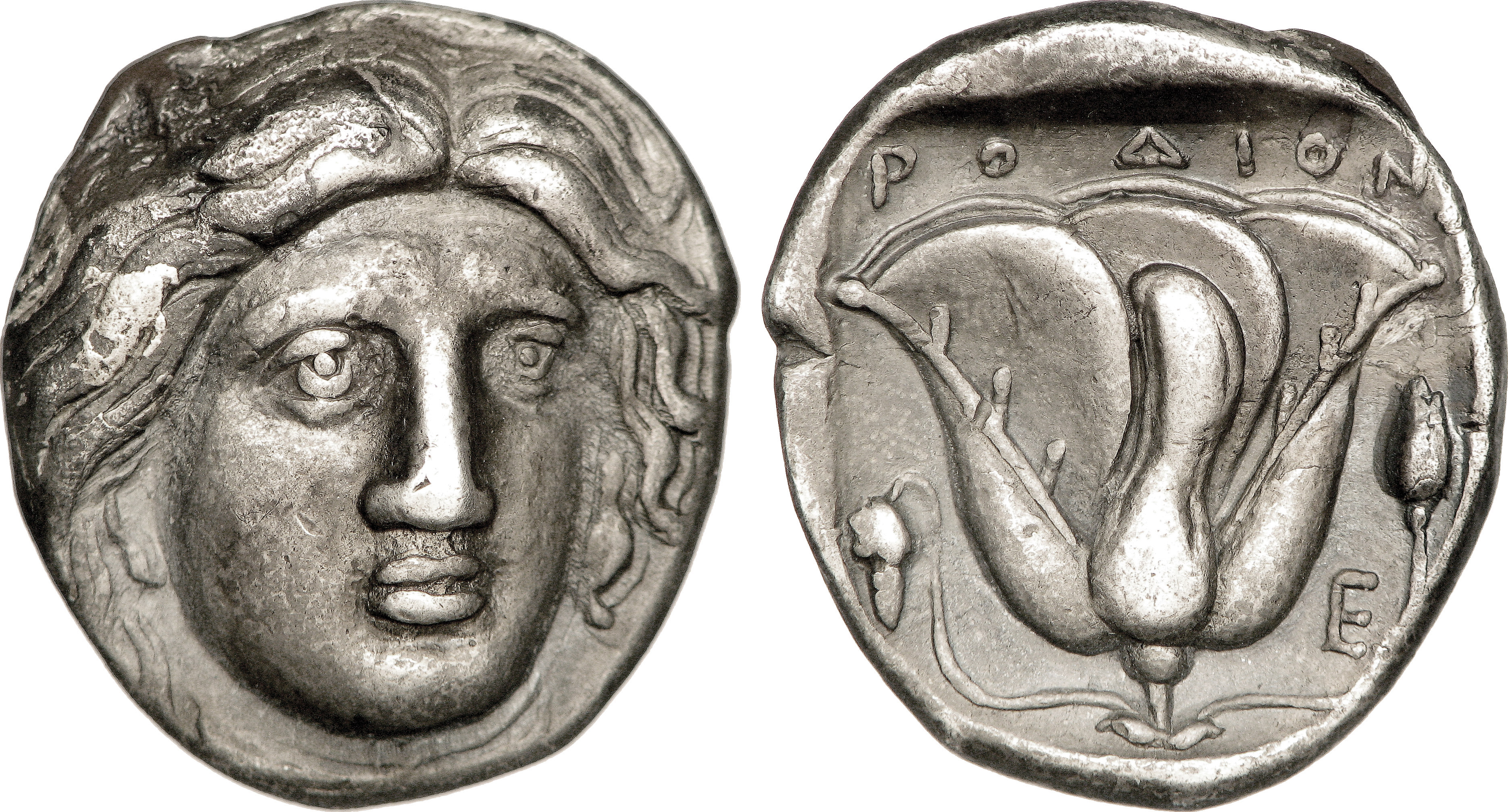
Rhodian tetradrachm from c. 316-305 BC, 15.13 g (Chian standard).

The Chian standard was first issued in Chios in the fifth century. The standard was based on an ideal stater of 15.6 g, but only half-staters (7.8 g) and sixths (2.6 g) were actually issued until the late fifth century. In the fourth century BC, the standard was adopted by Rhodes and became widespread in Caria, Ionia, the states of the Propontis and the Cyclades. At the beginning of the Hellenistic period, it was abandoned by Chios in favour of the Attic standard and Rhodes in favour of the Rhodian standard.

=== Cistophoric standard ===
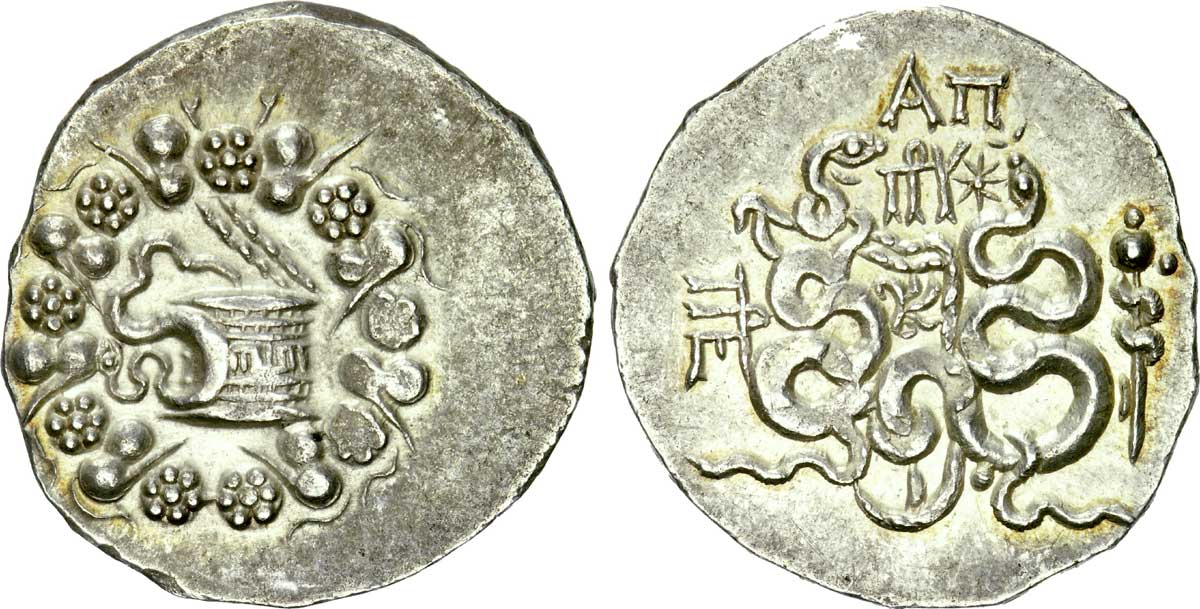
Cistophorus of Pergamum, ca. 123-100 BC, 12 g.

The Cistophoric standard was introduced by the Attalid dynasty of Pergamon around 190 BC and remained in use in western Asia Minor until the third century AD. The cistophorus itself was a tetradrachm of 12.6 g, divided into two didrachms of 6.3 g and four drachms of 3.15 g.

=== Milesian standard ===
The Milesian standard of the city of Miletus was based on a stater of 14.2 g, which could be divided into six hectae of 2.4 g or four drachmae of 3.55 g.

=== Parian-Thasian standard ===
The Parian-Thasian standard was used by the island of Paros in the Cyclades and its colony Thasos in the northern Aegean. It was based on a stater of around 10 g and may have originally been a reduced version of the Aeginetan standard. Under the commercial influence of Thasos, the standard was widely used in the fifth century BC by the Thracian tribal coinages.

=== Persian standard ===
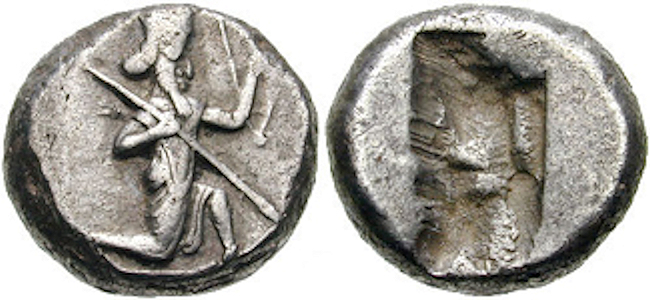
Siglos of the Achaemenid Empire, c. 485-470 BC, 5.38 g

The Persian standard was based on the silver coins minted by the Achaemenid Empire in Asia Minor, which consisted of a siglos or shekel of 5.5 g and a double siglos of around 11 g. Some Greek cities in Asia Minor with close connections to the Persian sphere, such as Colophon, Phaselis, and the cities of the Hellespont, minted drachms and didrachms on this standard in the Classical period. In the third century BC it was used by Byzantium.

=== Phocaean standard ===
The Phocaean standard originated in Phocaea, and was used only for electrum coinage, which was common in north-western Asia Minor in the Classical Period. It consisted of a stater of 16.1 g, divided into six hectae of 2.68 g.

=== Phocaen/Campanian standard ===
The Phocaean/Campanian standard was used by Velia (a Phocaean colony) and Poseidonia in southern Campania in the Archaic and Classical periods and spread from there to the Campanian mints. It had a stater of 7.5 g, divided into two drachmas of 3.75 g.

=== Phoenician standard ===
The Phoenician standard, used by the city-states of Phoenicia in the fourth century BC and by the Carthaginians for some issues, had a shekel of 7.25 g. The standard was adopted by the Chalcidian League and then by Philip II of Macedon in the fourth century BC, with a tetradrachm of 14.5 g, but abandoned in favour of the Attic standard under Alexander the Great. In Phoenicia and Coele-Syria, it remained in use in the Hellenistic period in both the Ptolemaic and Seleucid spheres, but with a reduced shekel of 7.1 g (equivalent to a Ptolemaic didrachm).

=== Ptoelmaic standard ===
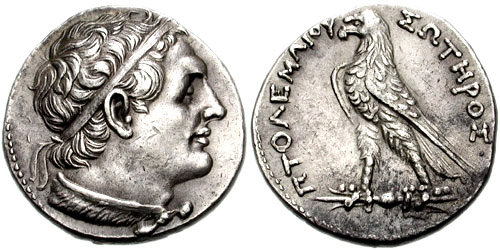
Tetradrachm of Ptolemy IV Philopator minted in Arados c. 214-212 BC, 14.10 g

The Ptolemaic standard was used by the Ptolemaic Kingdom for its silver coinage from 294 BC. It was based on a tetradrachm of 14.26 g and a drachma of 3.55 g. It was equivalent to the reduced Phoenician standard used in Ptolemaic Coele-Syria and Seleucid Phoenicia.

=== Rhodian standard ===
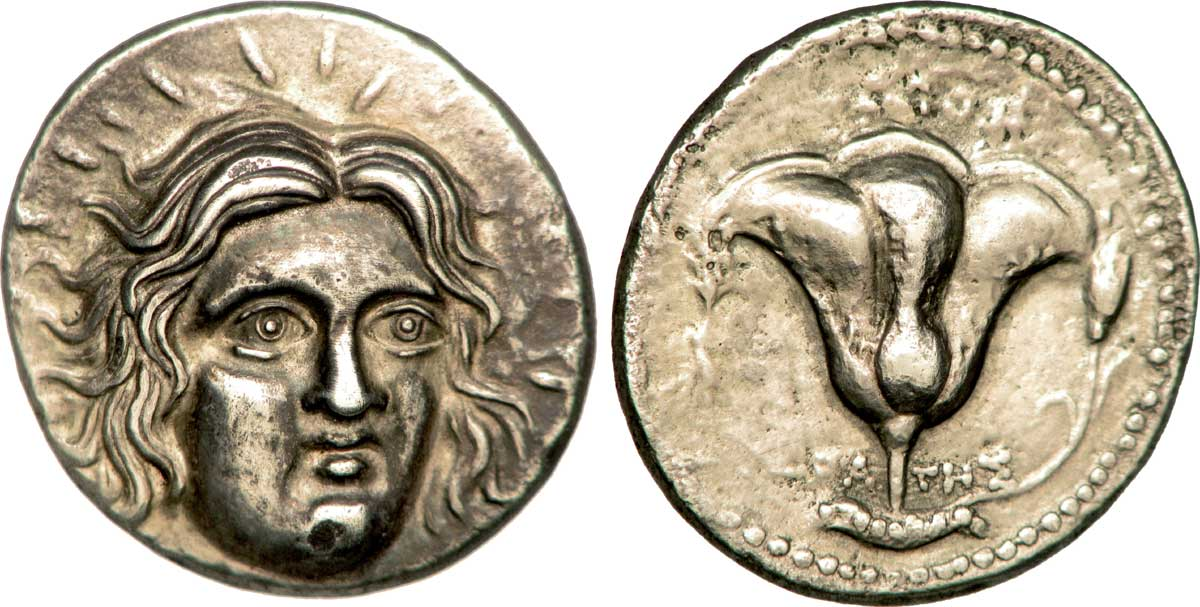
Rhodian tetradrachm from 230-205 BC by the magistrate Eukrates, 12.35 g (Rhodian standard).

The Rhodian standard, a reduced version of the Chian standard, was introduced by Rhodes around 300 BC and subsequently adopted throughout the Rhodian sphere in Caria and the central Aegean. It consisted of a tetradrachm of 13.4 g, didrachm of 6.7 g, and drachm of 3.4 g.

=== Samian standard ===
The Samian standard was used by Samos in the fifth century until replaced by the Attic standard in 412 BC. It used a tetradrachm of 13.1 g, a drachma of 3.3 g, and obols of 0.55 g.

== See also ==
- Attic talent
- Mina (unit)

== Bibliography ==
- Boehringer, Christof (2000). "Aspetto ponderale delle monetazioni greche ellenistiche". Annali dell'Istituto Italiano di Numismatica. 47: 77–110.
- Kallet, Lisa; Kroll, John H. (2020). The Athenian empire : using coins as sources. New York. ISBN 9781139058476.
- Mørkholm, Otto (1991). Early Hellenistic Coinage from the Accession of Alexander to the Peace of Apamaea (336-188 BC). Cambridge University Press. pp. 9–10. ISBN 978-0-521-39504-5.
- Rutter, Keith (1997). The Greek Coinages of Southern Italy and Sicily. Spink.
