= Cistophorus =

Ancient currency

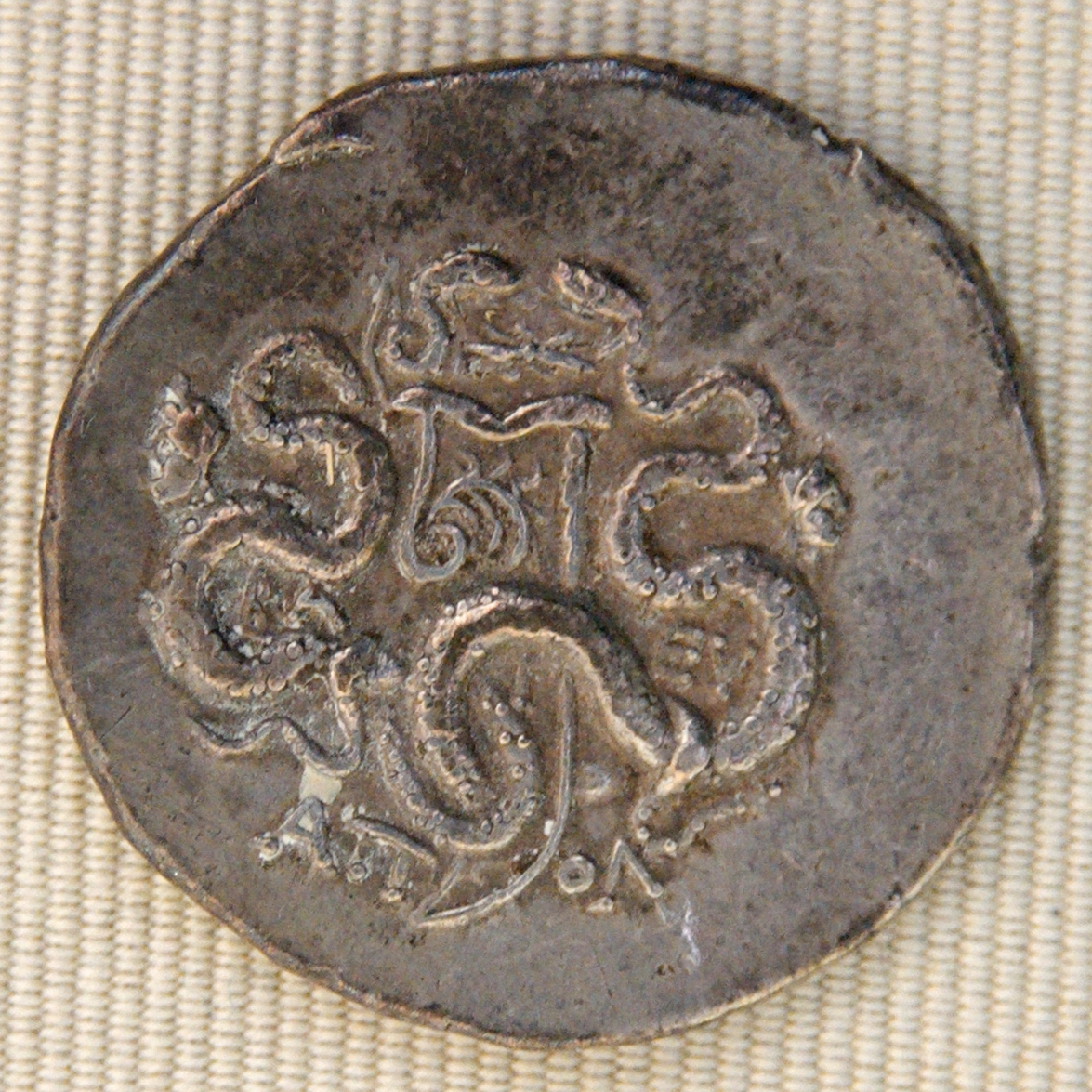
Cistophorus minted in Apollonis under the reign of Aristonicus (133–130 BC), Cabinet des Médailles

The cistophorus (Ancient Greek: κιστοφόρος, kistophoros) was a coin of ancient Pergamum. It was introduced shortly before 190 B.C. at that city to provide the Attalid kingdom with a substitute for Seleucid coins and the tetradrachms of Philetairos. It also came to be used by a number of other cities that were under Attalid control. These cities included Alabanda and Kibyra. It continued to be minted and circulated by the Romans with different coin types and legends down to the time of Septimius Severus, long after the kingdom was bequeathed to Rome. It owes its name to a figure, on the obverse, of the sacred chest (Latin: cista) of Dionysus.

== Cistophoric standard ==
It was tariffed at four drachmas, but weighed only as much as three Attic drachmas (the most important weight standard of the time), 12.5 grams. In addition, the evidence of hoards suggests that it did not travel outside the area which Pergamum controlled. It is therefore probable that it was overvalued in this area.

In any case, the result was a closed monetary system similar to that in the Ptolemaic Kingdom. It is likely that this was a deliberate policy.

In the long term, the average weight of the cistophori fell over the centuries from around 12.5 g per coin to around 8.5 g.

== Design and themes ==
Cistophoric coinage fails to portray reigning kings in its coins. It is possible that this lack of royal iconography is the result of Attalid royal ideology. The royal coinage is mimicking itself as a federal coinage. Attalid kings were unable to portray themselves as a charismatic and militaristic authority like the other Hellenistic rulers, as the kingdom during reign of Eumenes II received much of its power practically as a Roman gift. He portrayed himself as a benefactor of the Greeks living within Asia Minor.

The types reflect the Attalid kings' claims of descent from Dionysus and Heracles. The cista mystica on the obverse represents Dionysus while the bow case on the reverse represents Heracles, whose son, Telephus, was the mythological founder of Pergamon.

== See also ==
- List of ancient Greek monetary standards

== Bibliography ==
- Langenegger, Werner (2023). "Gewichtsentwicklung der Cistophoren vom Attalidenreich bis Septimius Severus" [Development of the weight of cistophores from the Attalid Empire to Septimius Severus]. Jahrbuch für Numismatik und Geldgeschichte 73, pp. 73-100.
- Meadows, Andrew (2013). "The Closed Currency System of the Attalid Kingdom", in: Peter Thonemann (ed.): Attalid Asia Minor. Money, International Relations, and the State. Oxford: Oxford University Press, pp. 149–205.
