= Seleucid coinage =

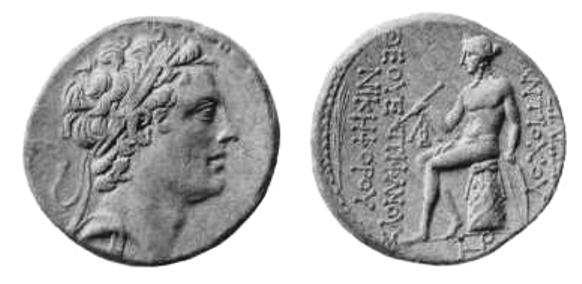
Antiochus IV

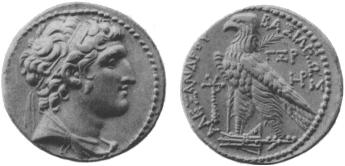
Alexander Balas

The coinage of the Seleucid Empire is based on the coins of Alexander the Great, which in turn were based on Athenian coinage of the Attic weight. Many mints and different issues are defined, with mainly base and silver coinage being in abundance. A large concentration of mints existed in the Seleucid Syria, as the Mediterranean parts of the empire were more reliant on coinage in economic function.

The symbol of Seleucid power was the anchor, which was placed on the obverse of coins depicting Alexander posthumously. Some Seleucid bronze coinage feature decorative serrated edges similarly with certain Roman denarii and rare Macedonian coins.

The first Seleucid royal mint was at Seleucia on the Tigris. Antioch, as a new capital, did have the most important mint after Seleucus I moved mint workers there from Seleucia.

== Denominations ==
Bronze coinage was issued in five denominations; the weight and size varies greatly and most likely no effort was made to conform to a set standard, they may be denominated in chalkoi.

- A size = 23+ mm = 10+ g
- B size = 18–23 mm = 6.77–8.63 g
- C size = 13–17 mm = 3.88 g
- D size = 12–13 mm = 1.59 g
- E size = 10–12 mm = 1.13 g

The denomination values and common imagery on silver coinage was as follows, with the denomination based on the Obol and image most common on the coin:

- 1 Obol: Anchor and Bow and Quiver.
- 2 Diobol: Bow and Quiver
- 3 Hemidrachm:
- 6 Drachm: Anchor
- 24 Tetradrachm: Elephant walking
- Coins with the head of Zeus on the reverse and Athena in elephant car. These coins are of a lighter Phoenician standard.

== History ==
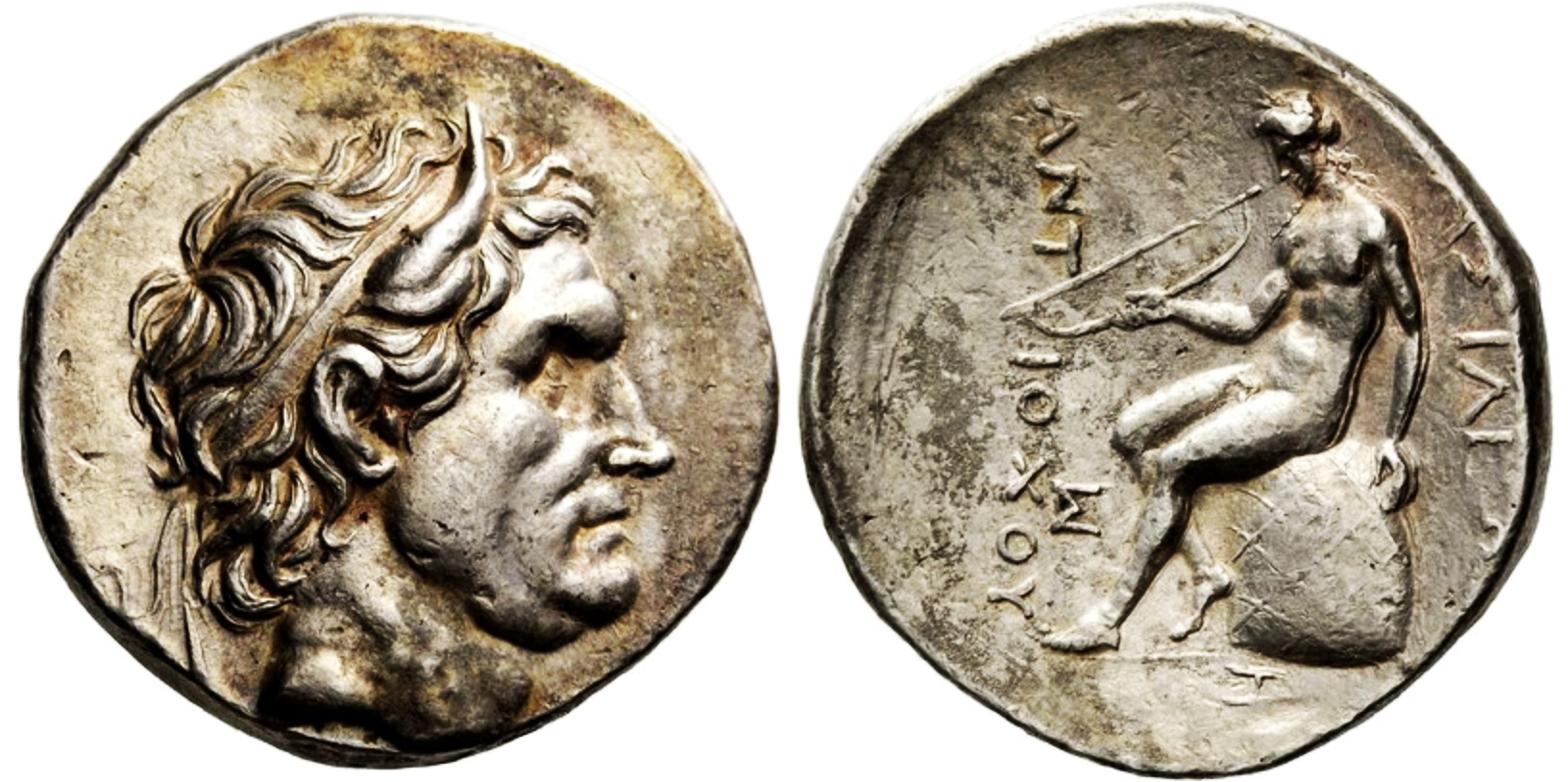
Seleucus I portrait on Antiochus I tetradrachm

Successor states of the Macedonian Empire continued to mint coins with image of Alexander the Great. Such coins were widespread within the Seleucid Empire, as all mints except the one in Bactra struck them. Antiochus I, son of Seleucus I, was the first Seleucid ruler to strike coins with his own image on them.

Typically, coins which were not based on Attic weight, did not circulate within the empire. Attalid, Ptolemaic and Rhodian coins were using a different standard. Regulations may have existed to enforce usage of the Attic standard. However, the regulations were probably made for practical reasons rather than being politically motivated. Coele-Syria and Phoenicia were exceptions to the rule of using the Attic standard. They were conquered by Antiochus III the Great in 200 BC. Seleucids struck some coins in the Ptolemaic standard to be used in the region, and both standards coexisted there.

Seleucid regulations on coinage different from Achaemenid Persia on several aspects. Achaemenid rulers did not try to unify standards for the coinage, and they allowed local satraps to strike coins in their own name. While the Seleucids preserved the system of satraps, they banned local rulers from striking coins in their own name. Some cities had their own mints for bronze coinage, while gold coins and large silver denominations were made only at the royal mints. However, the empire controlled on some extent even the striking of local bronze coinage.

After Antiochus III was defeated in a war against Rome and a large war indemnity had to be paid, silver coinage became scarcer and lighter. There were few new silver coins struck for two decades after the defeat. Bronze mostly replaced silver in mints between 173 BC and 171 BC.

When the Seleucid Empire began to decline, and its rule on parts of the empire weakened since the last decades of the second century BC, local cities began producing their own silver coinages to show their autonomy from the central bureaucracy.

Despite seemingly enforcing some regulations, Seleucid policy was still somewhat free compared to the Ptolemaic Kingdom which imposed an exclusive royal currency. In coin making process there were similarities with the Ptolemaic coinage. For instance, the Seleucid coins often have a central depression from the coin making process.

== Mints ==
Seleucid core territory around Syria had a large concentration of mints. Eastern provinces had a single mint each. Mediterranean regions of the Seleucid kingdom were more monetized, and were economically more reliant on coinage. Use of coinage in Mesopotamia, including areas such as Babylonia and Susiana, was most likely mainly an urban phenomenon, while in rural areas Greek coinage was not necessary for daily life. In Mesopotamia taxation and official payments were most likely the parts of economy where coinage saw usage. Despite Mesopotamia seeing increasing use of coinage during the Hellenistic period, the impact may have been a modest one. Traditional methods of payment did not disappear.

Seleucia on the Tigris held the first Seleucid mint as a capital. Later, when Seleucus I Nicator prioritized construction of an important port city of Antioch over Seleucia, workers from the Seleucia mint were moved to new capital at Antioch. The mint at Antioch produced gold coins, as well as royal bronze coins minted in name of the king. The old mint at Seleucia functioned as a municipal mint at this point, and they did mint the coins in their own name. Furthermore, the mint at Antioch produced more bronze coins than Seleucia. Seleucid dynasty seems to have attempted to create a uniform coinage throughout the empire, as coins with similar symbols and images have been discovered from coinage minted all around the empire. These common symbols include an anchor and a charging bull.

Early coinage of the Seleucid Empire was struck in name of Alexander the Great, or the coins at least included his image. Bactra mint was an exception to this almost universal rule as it did not strike coins with the image of Alexander the Great.

Mint in Ptolemais in Phoenicia was among the most active ones. While other mints generally used Attic weight, the one in Ptolemais struck coins in a different weight, even after it was conquered by Antiochus III the Great. It is likely that the city struck silver coinage without an interruption after it changed hands, as it was a very important city in Phoenicia.

=== Western mints ===
- Abydus
- Antioch
- Apamea
- Arados
- Berytus
- Carrhae
- Cyzicus
- Edessa
- Lampsacus
- Laodicea in Syria
- Marathus
- Ptolemais in Phoenicia
- Seleucia in Pieria
- Seleucia on the Tigris
- Sidon
- Tarsus
- Tyre

=== Eastern mints ===
- Ai-Khanoum
- Arachosia
- Babylon
- Bactra
- Several mints in Bactria
- Drangiana
- Ecbatana
- Seleucia on the Tigris
- Susa

== Design and symbols ==
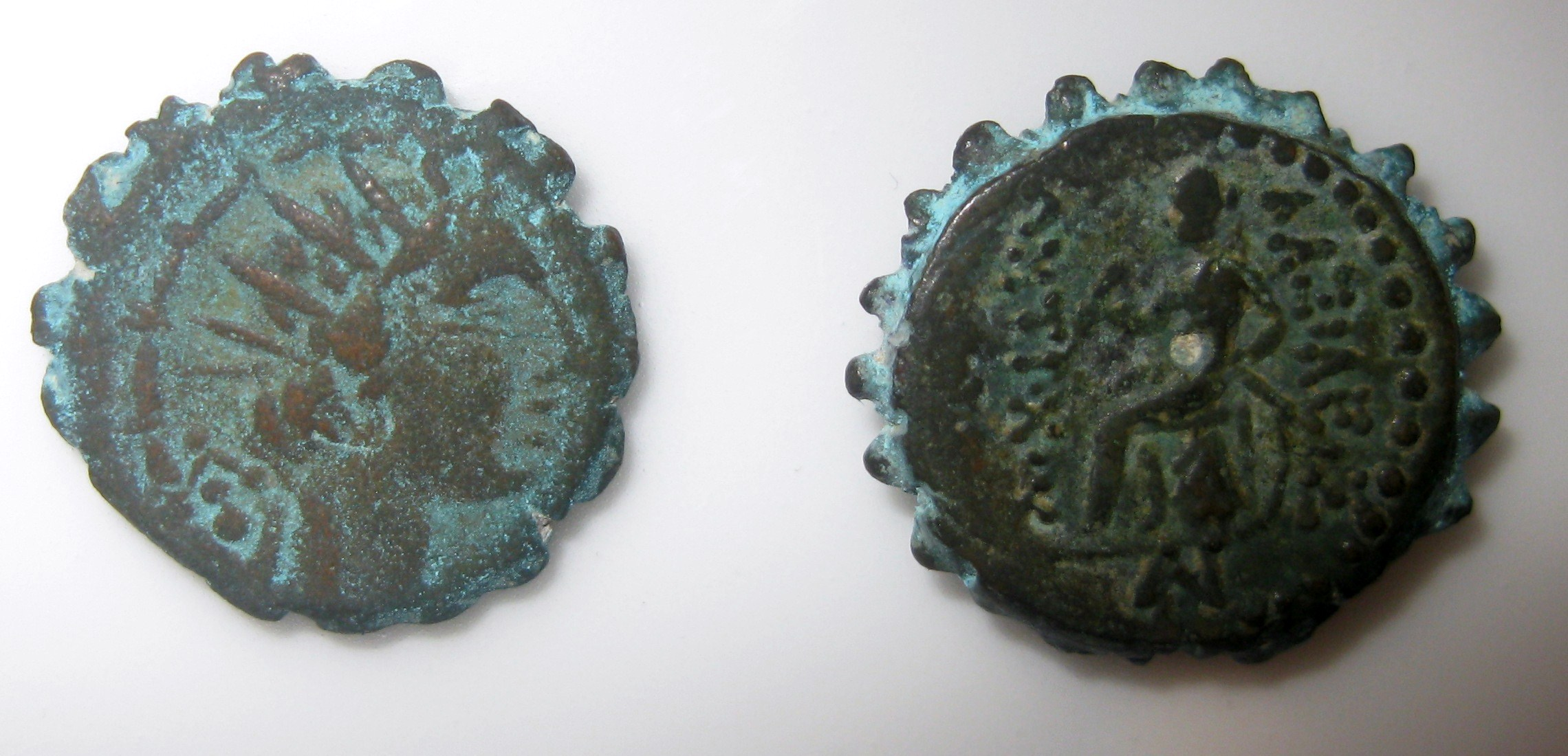
Bronze coin of Antiochus IV

Anchor was the symbol of Seleucid dynasty starting from the reign of Seleucus I Nicator in 305 BC, and it was used by his successors. The anchor first appeared in reverses of coins with Alexander the Great's image in them. Such coins with Alexander in them were very common in the Diadochi states. Origins of the anchor as a symbol is obscure, but there are several theories about the origin. For instance, it may commemorate Seleucus' career under Ptolemaic rule between 315 BC and 312 BC. Another theory is that the anchor was a form of propaganda aimed at merchants to lure them back into Northern Syrian cities and their new harbors built by Seleucus.

After Seleucus I's death, his successors began to strike coins with their own image. Coins of the Seleucid Empire had imagery including a reigning king with a lion head dress, or Zeus on a throne with a sceptre and eagle in each hand. Certain coins portrayed a god or goddess, or in some cases they had a medusa, a charging bull or an anchor.

Coinage struck by Antiochus IV Epiphanes can be considered to be iconographically innovative when compared to other Seleucid rulers. He is associated with various celestial attributes and symbols such as stars and rays about his head. Both Antiochus IV and Seleucus IV Philopator struck coins with the solar deity Helios. Another deity closely associated with reign of these two rulers and brothers is Apollo.

=== Serrated coins ===
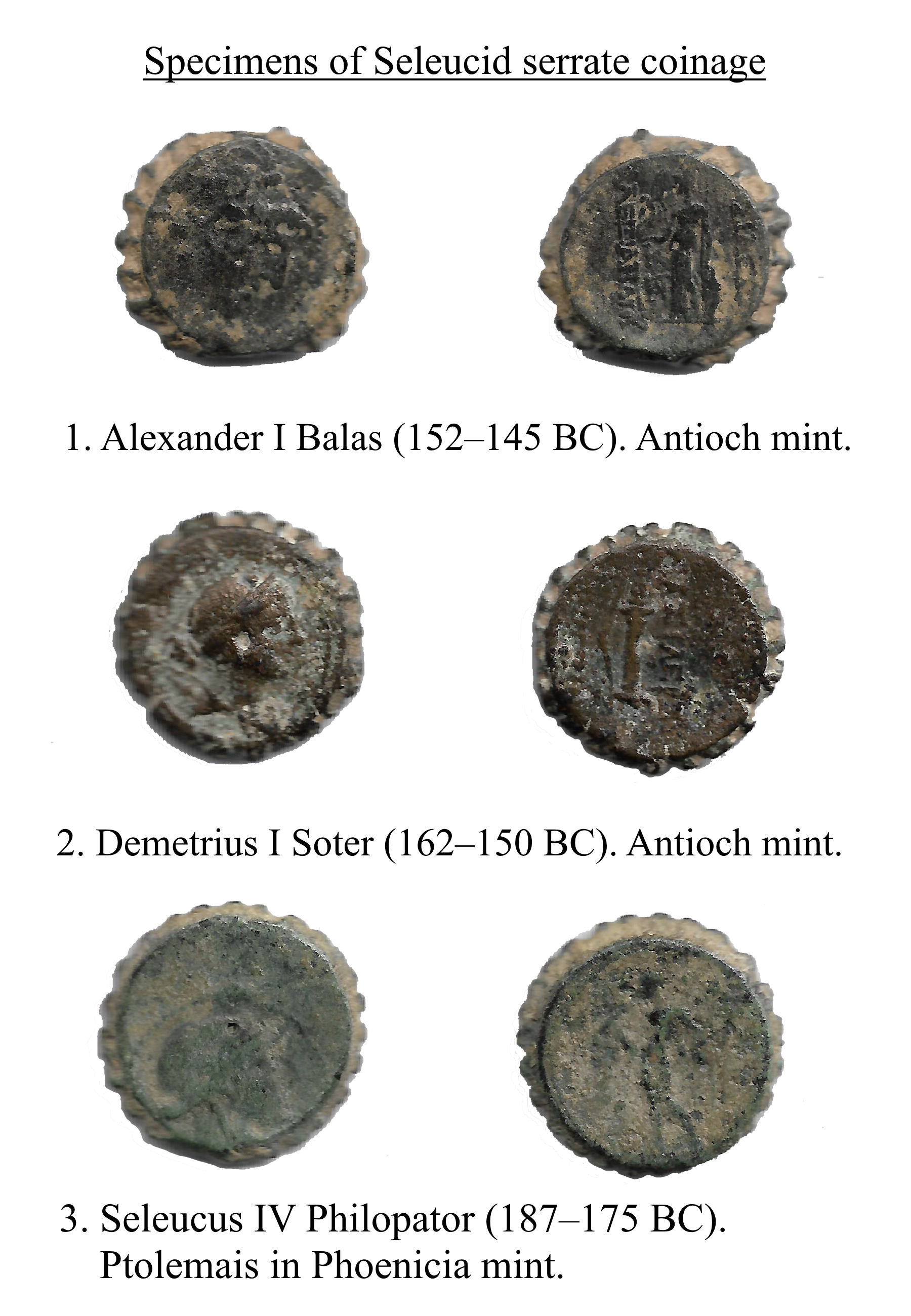
Bronze coins with the typical bottle cap shape

Certain Seleucid bronze coinage have serrated edges, otherwise rare in ancient coins. They are sometimes called bottle cap coins. Seleucid mints struck this type of bronze coinage within an approximate period of 187 BC–141 BC. This period was between reigns of Seleucus IV and Antiochus VI.

As a comparison, there are known instances of coins with serrated edges from the Kingdom of Macedon during the reign of Philip V. Like in the Seleucid mints, the Macedonians did also somewhat quickly discard the process.

One theory is that the serrated edge made it easier to prove that the coin was solid metal. However, only the Seleucid bronze coinage, rather than coins of gold and silver, feature this sort of an edge. Certain Roman serrated denarii were especially designed to be harder to counterfeit or debase. However, the Roman efforts probably failed since there are silver plated copper denarii in existence. Seleucids are believed to not have serrated their coins as an anti-counterfeiting measure. Syrian mints serrated their coins simply as a decorative method, and it is also possible that the Romans also sought only the aesthetic value.

== See also ==
- Coinage of Side
- Legacy of the Indo-Greeks#Influence of Indo-Greek coinage
- Coinage of the Kingdom of Pontus
- Ptolemaic coinage
