= Attic talent =

Ancient Greek unit of weight

The Attic talent (a talent of the Attic standard), also known as the Athenian talent or Greek talent (Greek: τάλαντον, talanton), is an ancient unit of weight equal to about 26 kilograms (57 lb), as well as a unit of value equal to this amount of pure silver. A talent was originally intended to be the mass of water required to fill an amphora, about one cubic foot (28 L).

== History ==
The earliest known Athenian coins range between the years of 545 BC to 515 BC. However, Athenians had already adopted the drachma and the obol as a form of currency. The corresponding weights vary before and after the Athenians began to produce coins. After the reign of Solon, the change of standard was lowered to half of its former weight. As the Athenian league's influence expanded over the Mediterranean, the Attic standard became one of the major weight standards adopted during the Archaic and Hellenistic Period.

During the Peloponnesian War, a trireme crew of 200 rowers was paid a talent for a month's worth of work, one drachma, or 4.3 grams of silver per rower per day. According to wage rates from 377 BC, a talent was the value of nine man-years of skilled work. This corresponds to 2340 work days or 11.1 grams (0.36 ozt) of silver per worker per workday.

The Attic talent, corresponding with the standard, would change throughout the time of Alexander the Great and the Hellenistic Period, subsequently diminishing its value little by little.

== Currency or weight ==
The subsequent units would then become as follows, obol, drachma, mina, and heaviest being the talent. An Attic talent is equivalent to 60 minae, 6,000 drachmae or 36,000 oboloi.

== See also ==
- Attic weight
- Talent (measurement)
- Drachmae
