= Ptolemaic coinage =

Coinage of Hellenistic Egypt

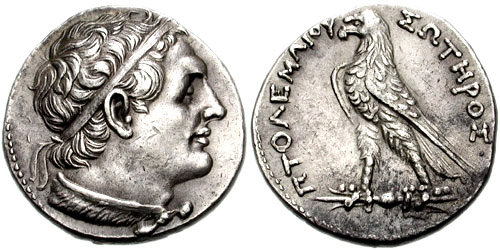
A silver tetradrachm of Ptolemy IV Philopator (r. 221 – 205 BC); an undated issue from the Arados royal mint, struck c. 214–212 BC, 26 mm in width, 14.10 gm in weight; the obverse shows a diademed head of Ptolemy I Soter wearing the aegis, while the reverse shows an eagle standing on a thunderbolt with a Greek inscription: ΠΤΟΛΕΜΑΙΟΥ ΣΩΤΗΡΟΣ, lit. 'of Ptolemy Soter'.

Coinage of the Ptolemaic kingdom was struck in Phoenician weight, also known as Ptolemaic weight (about 14.2 grams) which was the weight of a Ptolemaic tetradrachm. This standard, which was not used elsewhere in the Hellenistic world, was smaller than the dominant Attic weight (about 17.28 grams) which was the weight of standard Hellenistic tetradrachm. Consequentially, Ptolemaic coins are smaller than other Hellenistic coinage. In terms of art, the coins, which were made of silver, followed the example set by contemporary Greek currencies, with dynastic figures being typically portrayed. The Ptolemaic coin making process often resulted in a central depression, similar to what can be found on Seleucid coinage.

The Ptolemaic dynasty introduced standard coinage to Egypt, where pre-existing native dynasties made only very limited use of coins. Egyptian gold stater was the first coin ever minted in ancient Egypt around 360 BC during the reign of pharaoh Teos of the 30th Dynasty. These coins were used to pay salaries of Greek mercenaries in his service.

The first Ptolemaic mint was in Memphis and was later moved to Alexandria. Succeeding in monetizing the Egyptian society, largely due to efforts of king Ptolemy II Philadelphus, the Ptolemaic kingdom flourished. For most of its history, the kingdom vigorously enforced a policy of a single currency, confiscating foreign coins found on its territory and forcing its dominions to adopt Ptolemaic coinage. In the rare cases when these dominions were allowed their own currency, such as the Jewish community in Palestine, they still had to observe the Ptolemaic weight. These policies, along with inflation and increasing difficulty to obtain silver, caused monetary isolation of the Ptolemaic coinage.

After Egypt was annexed into the Roman Empire and the Ptolemaic dynasty ceased to exist, its currency still remained in circulation. This was the case until the rule of Emperor Nero. Silver from the coins was reused for Roman tetradrachm. Denarii and aurei did not circulate in the former Ptolemaic Kingdom, so Egypt's monetary isolation continued.

== Design and symbolism ==
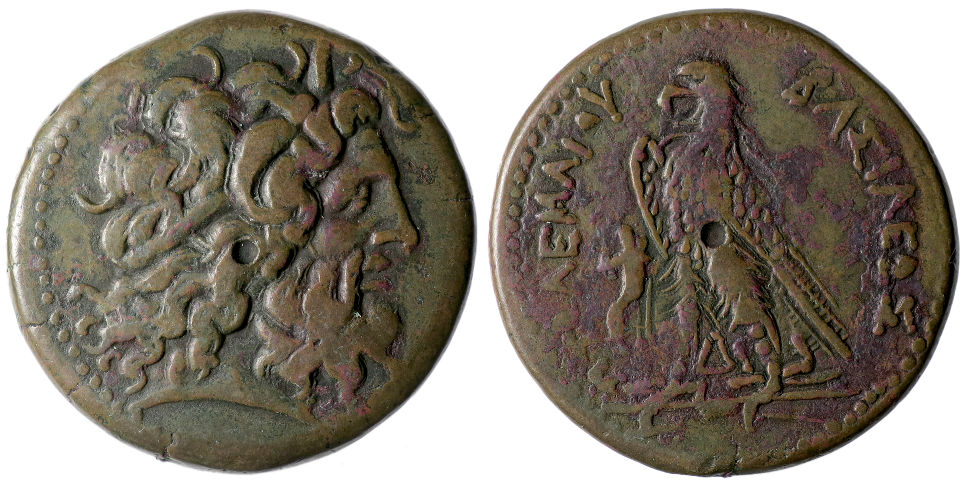
Ptolemy V Epiphanes' bronze coin. Depression in center of the coin can be clearly seen both on obverse and reverse sides. Reverse shows a common Ptolemaic symbol, the eagle standing on a thunderbolt.

The Ptolemaic Kingdom used Phoenician weight instead of the more common Attic weight. Phoenician weight, also known as Ptolemaic weight, was about 14.20 grams which was the weight of a Ptolemaic tetradrachm. The more common Attic weight from other Hellenistic states was approximately 17.26 grams which was the weight of standard Hellenistic tetradrachm. Ptolemaic coinage was struck in different standard, and the kingdom sought to obtain full royal control on coinage in circulation. The largest denominations of Ptolemaic bronze coinage weighed up to 100 grams.

Artistically, Ptolemaic coinage closely followed contemporary Greek currencies. A commonplace symbol of the Ptolemaic dynasty is an eagle standing on a thunderbolt, first adopted by Ptolemy I Soter. The more peculiar Ptolemaic coinage include so-called "dynastic issues". Ptolemy II Philadelphus married his sister Arsinoe II, possibly to gain legitimacy in eyes of the local Egyptian population. Egyptian rulers had traditionally married their sisters to signify a connection to sacred union between the deities Osiris and Isis. A medal-like coin with one side portraying Ptolemy II and Arsinoe II, and the other side portraying Ptolemy I and Berenice I was struck after the death of Arsinoe II. She had significant posthumous influence on Egyptian religious life, and the ruling Greek dynasty was deified.

In the coin making process, there were similarities with Seleucid coinage. For instance, Ptolemaic coins often have a central depression from the coin making process.

== Mints ==
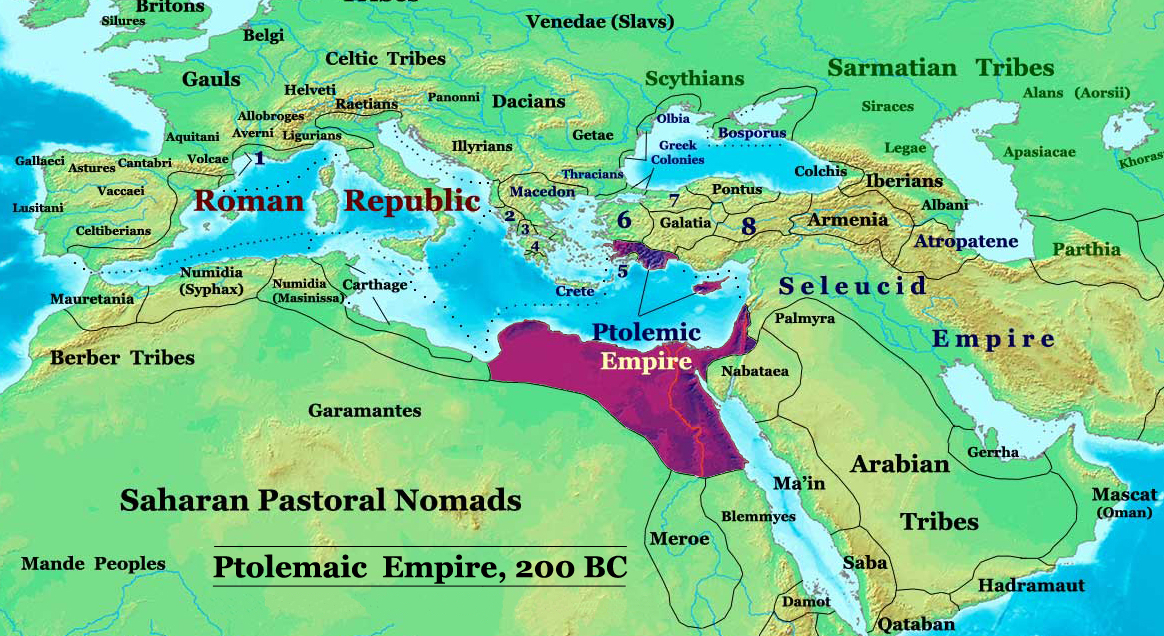
Ptolemaic dominions in 200 BC

Coinage was used in the Ptolemaic Kingdom during the last dynasty of Egypt and, briefly, during Roman rule of Egypt. The first Ptolemaic mint was at Memphis. It was later moved to Alexandria.

Tyre was the most important coastal city out of the five Ptolemaic cities with a mint in Syria. After the Seleucid Kingdom led by Antiochus III the Great conquered Coele-Syria Ptolemais in Phoenicia (Acre) was still allowed to strike coins using the Phoenician weight. The mint remained very prolific, and was among the most active ones in the Seleucid Kingdom. It is likely that the city struck silver coinage without an interruption after it changed hands, as it was a very important city in Phoenicia. However, the Seleucids discontinued a Ptolemaic mint in Jaffa.

In Greece, Ptolemaic coinage mainly originates from the Peloponnese and Euboea. Corinth did not strike Ptolemaic coinage during its brief subordination to the kingdom.

Cyprus had many important mints, and the island struck large amounts of Ptolemaic coinage from 200 BC to 80 BC. Cyprus was also richer in silver than Egypt. In the second century BC, most of the Cypriot coinage are easily identifiable and datable because they include abbreviations for mints and dates for both gold and silver coinage. Cypriot mints from this period include Salamis (abbr. ΣA), Kition (abbr. KI) and Paphos (abbr. Π, and later as ΠA). Meanwhile, at Crete, there was no royal coinage in use, and Cretan cities had a strong autonomy of minting their own coins.

There are no evidence that Ptolemaic mints existed in Asia Minor. Furthermore, regions such as Cilicia and Lycia had no autonomous mints striking local currency. It seems that there was little circulation of Ptolemaic currency in Caria, Lycia, Pamphylia and Cilicia. Local Pamphylian silver coinage was discontinued under Ptolemaic control. It is likely that people in southern Asia Minor simply did not have a habit of using coinage in everyday economic transactions.

== History ==
=== Background ===
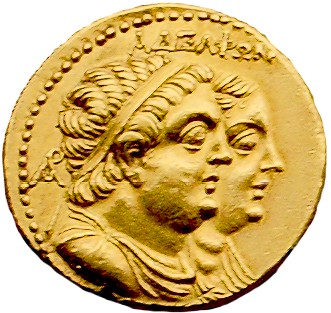
Gold oktodrachm of Ptolemy II Philadelphus and his sister-wife Arsinoe II

Silver was scarcer than gold in Egypt, and the exact ratio of their value is unclear. Silver was however probably shipped in significant quantities from abroad. In addition, Ptolemaic Cyprus produced some silver for coinage struck locally.

Coinage was not used in Egypt during pre-Ptolemaic native dynasties. It has been deduced from discoveries of ancient foreign coinage in Egypt that foreign currency was used as bullion rather than as money during the native dynasties. During Ptolemaic rule, Egypt transformed from a widely currency-free society to a largely monetized one by the course of the third century BC. King Ptolemy II Philadelphus had a marked influence in the process. Greek rule monetized Egyptian taxation, and this was one of the key reasons for the success of the Ptolemaic state. Before the Ptolemaic period, metals such as copper, and grain, were used as mediums of exchange. Ptolemaic rule brought, in addition to the coinage, banks and tax farming to the country. However, even centuries earlier, increasing trade with Greece seemingly had strengthened the process of monetization. Founding of the Greek trading colony of Naukratis had coincided with the strengthening trade relations.

=== Monetary isolation ===
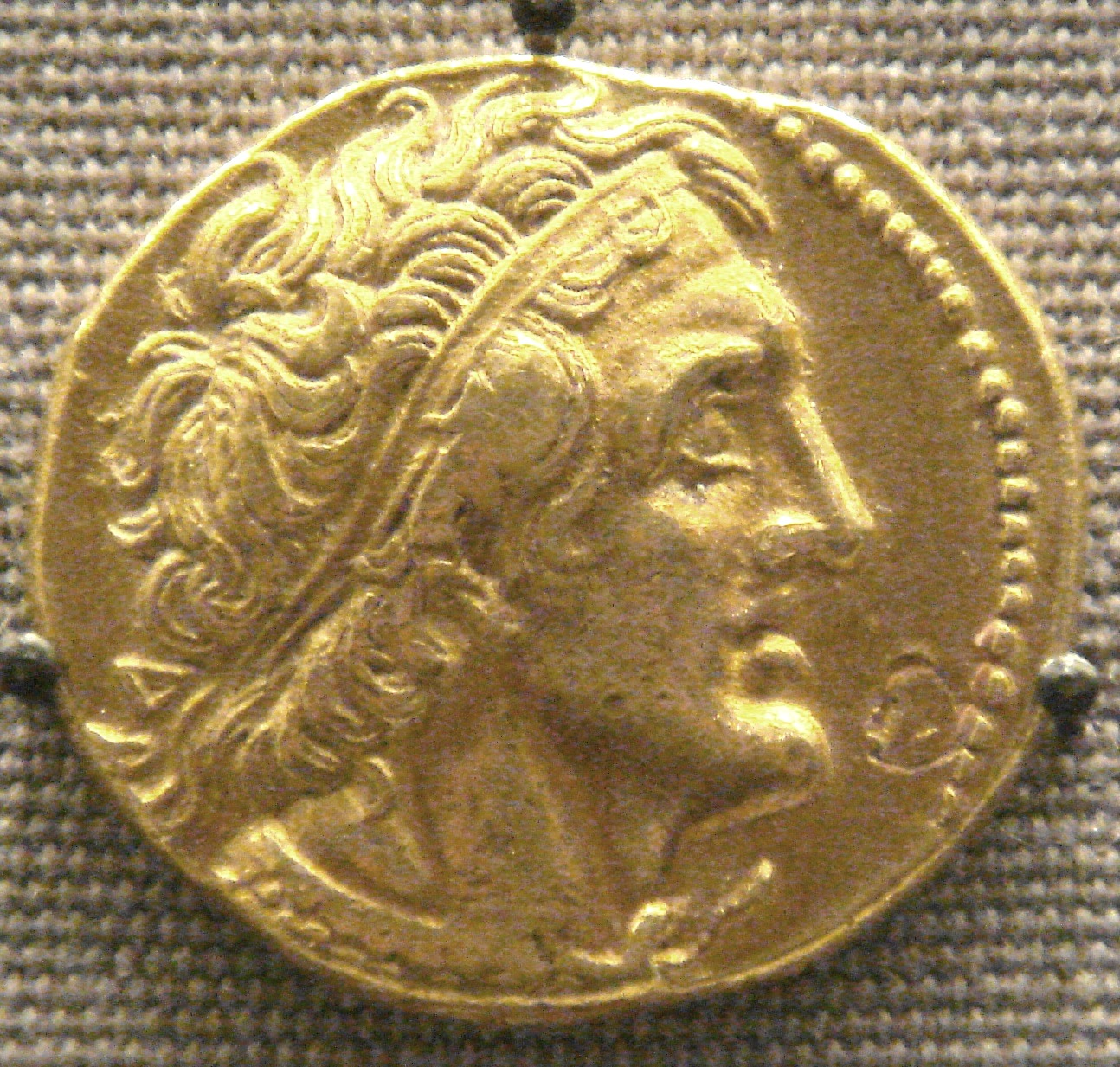
Gold tetradrachm of Ptolemy I Soter, British Museum, London

The Ptolemaic Kingdom did not use the Attic weight, or Attic standard, which was very common in other contemporary Hellenistic states such as the Seleucid Kingdom. Instead, the Ptolemaic Kingdom used Phoenician weight, which was smaller than the Attic weight. Consequently Ptolemaic coinage was smaller than coins used by other Hellenistic states. The kingdom also briefly utilized Rhodian standard in the transition process to the Phoenician weight. A possible reason for this very brief usage of the Rhodian weight in coinage may have resulted from strong commercial ties with the island of Rhodes. However, the Rhodian standard was lighter than Attic but heavier than Phoenician weight. As a result, the process shows a clear downward scale in size of the coinage. Despite this coincidence, political reasons and trade partnerships are still offering better explanations than a proposed theory that value of silver was in appreciation during Ptolemy I's reign.

During most of the Ptolemaic Kingdom's history, it was a policy that all foreign coinage within Egypt would be confiscated by the state and replaced with Ptolemaic currency. Parallels between Athens and the Ptolemaic Kingdom can be drawn as Athens attempted to introduce a sole currency in its empire. The Ptolemaic Kingdom forced its own monetary system to its foreign dominions. In rare cases, where cities under Ptolemaic dominion were allowed to keep their local currency, the cities were still forced to convert their currency to Phoenician weight.

=== Yehud coinage ===
Palestine region and Judea came under Ptolemaic control when Ptolemy I Soter took control of Yehud Medinata in 320 BC. But there was considerable instability in the area after his rule there was challenged.

Yehud coinage was used in Judea during the previous Achaemenid period. Mostly small denominations were minted there. When the Ptolemies took over Palestine, they allowed this coinage to continue with modifications. It appears that the previous minting authorities were allowed to continue their issues, and there is no evidence that the Egyptian weight system was used. Rather, the Attic standard prevailed after the Macedonian conquest.

The minting of small denomination coins continued, for example coins with Ptolemy and Berenike. Minting of some local coins was allowed with the names of local magistrates.

The Ptolemaic coins minted in Judea carried only the Hebrew letters YHD (Yehud), and no Greek lettering. The minting of Yehud coins stopped after the Ptolemaic period. The next coin series was minted only at the time of John Hyrcanus I with different legends. Substantial advances have been made in the study of Yehud and Samaria coins in the 21st century.

Neighboring Seleucid Kingdom's policy was also not so strict in imposing the royal control on mints.

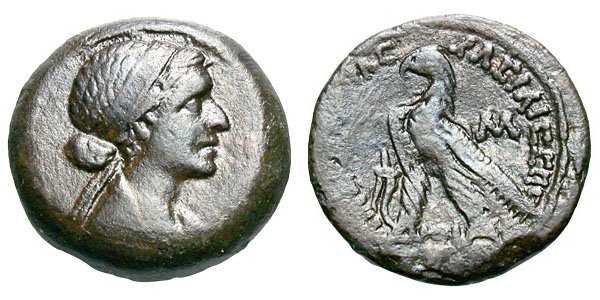
Cleopatra VII. 51–30 BC, 40 drachms, minted at Alexandria; obverse: diademed bust of Cleopatra VII. Reverse: inscription reading "ΒΑΣΙΛΙΣΣΗΣ ΚΛΕΟΠΑΤΡΑΣ", with an eagle standing on thunderbolt.

During the reign of Ptolemy I Soter, the founder of the kingdom, diverse local currencies were allowed to exist. They may even have been encouraged. The exact date of elimination of non-Ptolemaic coinage varies by region. As early as during Ptolemy I's reign, the closed nature of Ptolemaic monetary system started to form. In Egypt and Syria, Ptolemy I discontinued local coinage, which had Alexander the Great's image struck in them, after feeling secure in power. Such coinage with Alexander on them were very common in the successor states of the Macedonian Empire. Cypriot coinage was eliminated when the local monarchies ceased to exist. In Cyrene it took even longer to eliminate municipal coinage. In Crete the local currency was never suppressed. Uniformity of the currency was sought flexibly, yet opportunistically.

As it became increasingly difficult to obtain silver for the Ptolemaic kingdom, bronze coinage largely replaced silver in Egypt. Furthermore, monetary isolation was increased by other factors, like considerable inflation and the use of a unique standard to replace the Attic weight. Early Ptolemaic silver coinage was struck from pure silver, but by the time of Cleopatra VII it had suffered a very large degree of debasement. Despite the economic difficulties in the Ptolemaic realm, economically notable debasement began in 136 BC. After Cleopatra VII's economic reform in 51 BC a type of stater that was only one third silver was issued.

=== Roman era ===
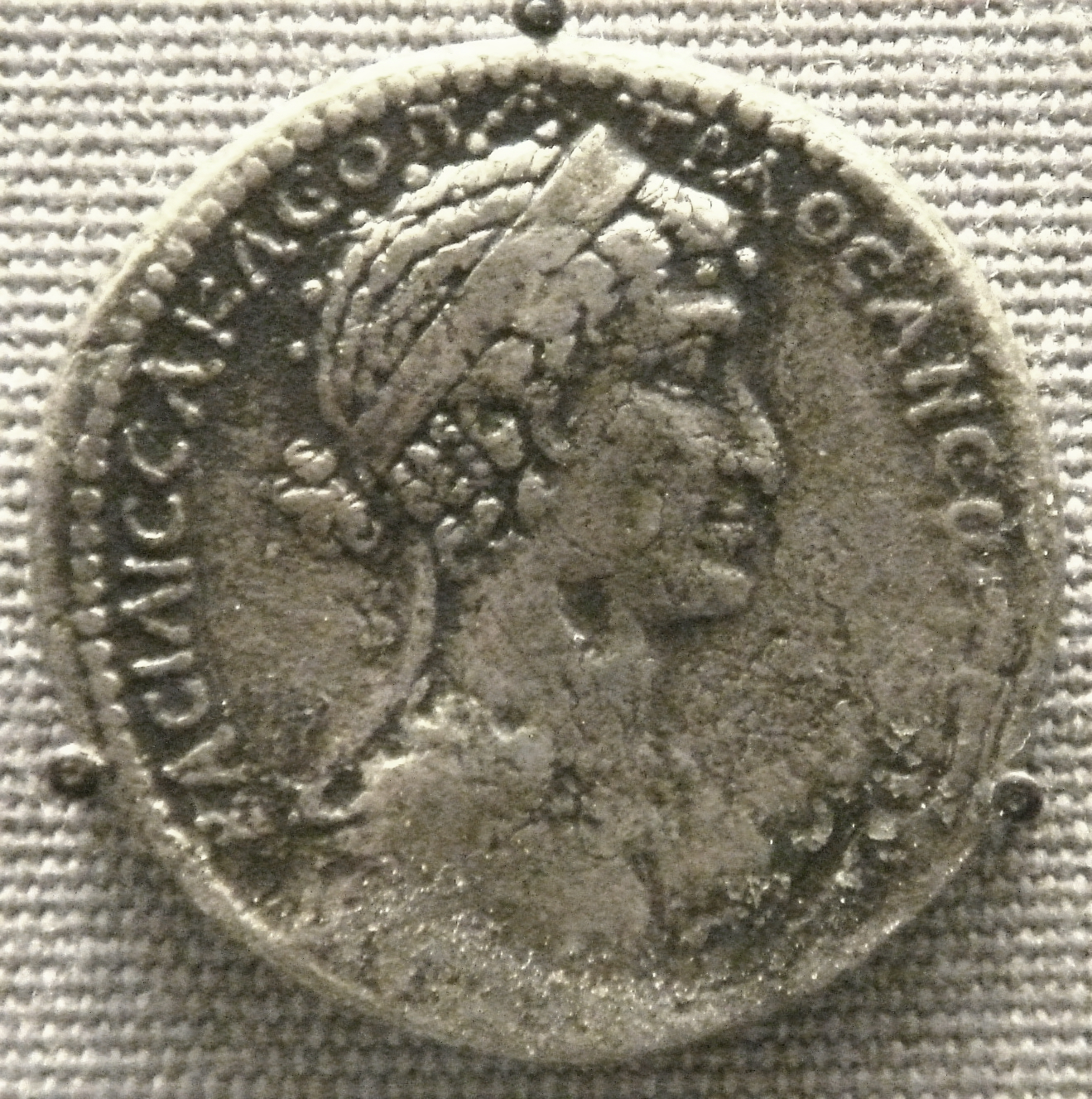
Tetradrachm of Cleopatra VII Philopator, the last ruler of the Ptolemaic Kingdom. Legend: ΒΑCΙΛΙCCΑ ΚΛΕΟΠΑΤΡΑ ΘΕΑ ΝEΩΤEΡΑ.

After the demise of the Ptolemaic Kingdom, Egypt became a province of the Roman Empire, but silver coinage struck by the Ptolemies still continued to circulate. The Ptolemaic silver coinage had mostly disappeared by the time of Emperor Nero (AD 54-68), probably melted down and restruck as Roman provincial coinage. Under Roman control, Egypt retained the closed monetary system, as it had been under Ptolemies. Roman denarii and aurei did not circulate in provincial Egypt.

== See also ==
- Egyptian gold stater
- Rhodian coinage
- Coinage of Side
- Coinage of the Kingdom of Pontus
- Seleucid coinage

== Bibliography ==
- Lorber, Catharine (2018). Coins of the Ptolemaic Empire I: Ptolemy I through Ptolemy IV. New York: American Numismatic Society. ISBN 9780897223560.
- Faucher, Thomas; Meadows, Andrew; Lorber, Catharine (2017). Egyptian hoards I:The Ptolemies. Institut français d'archéologie orientale du Caire. ISBN 9782724706895.
