= Rhodian coinage =

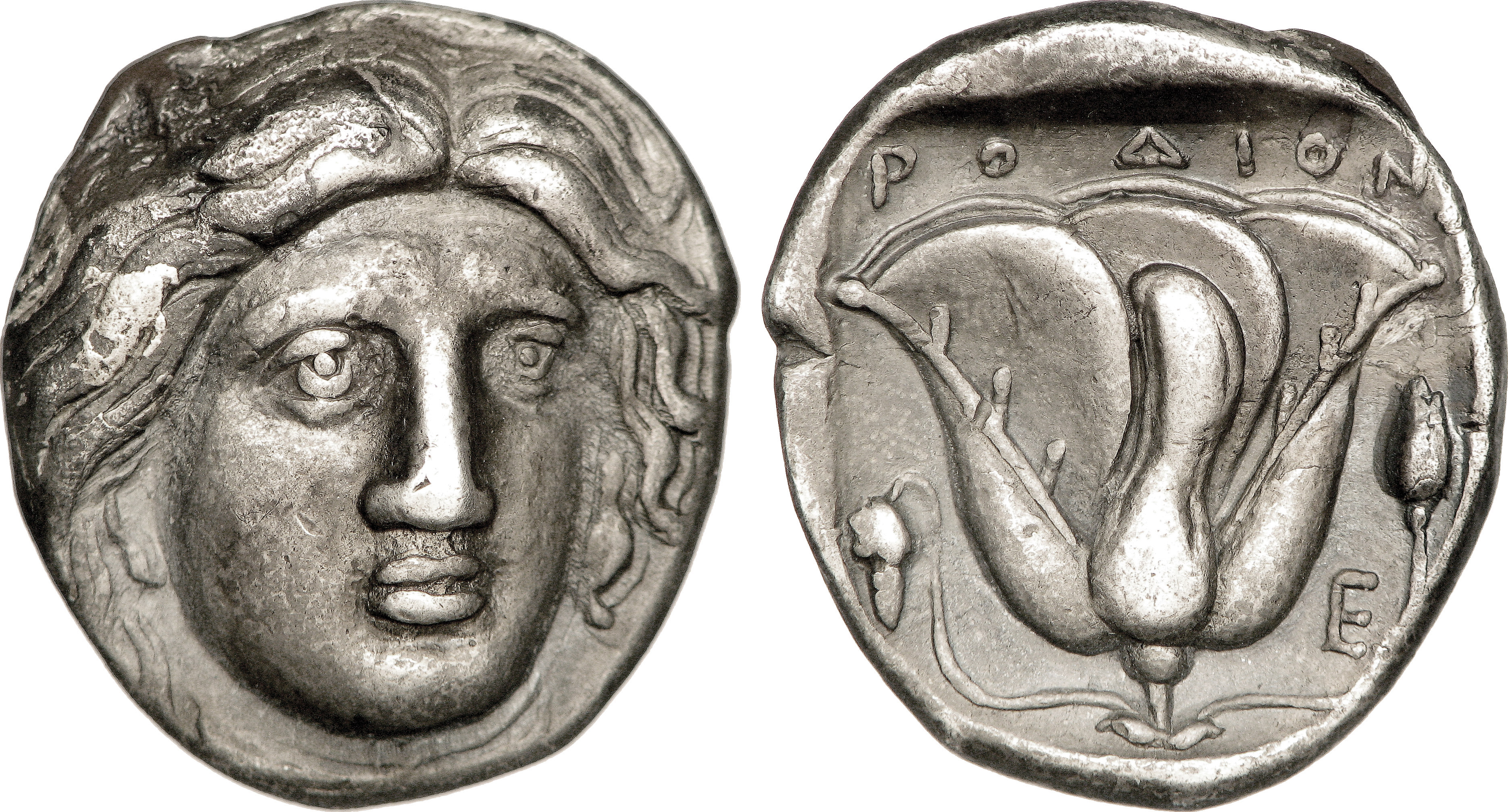
Rhodian tetradrachm from c. 316-305 BC

Ancient Rhodian coinage refers to the coinage struck by an independent Rhodian polity during Classical and Hellenistic eras. The Rhodians also controlled territory on neighbouring Caria that was known as Rhodian Peraia under the islanders' rule. However, many other eastern Mediterranean states and polities adopted the Rhodian (Chian) monetary standard following Rhodes. Coinage using the standard achieved a wide circulation in the region. Even the Ptolemaic Kingdom, a major Hellenistic state in the eastern Mediterranean, briefly adopted the Rhodian monetary standard.

== Rhodian monetary standard ==
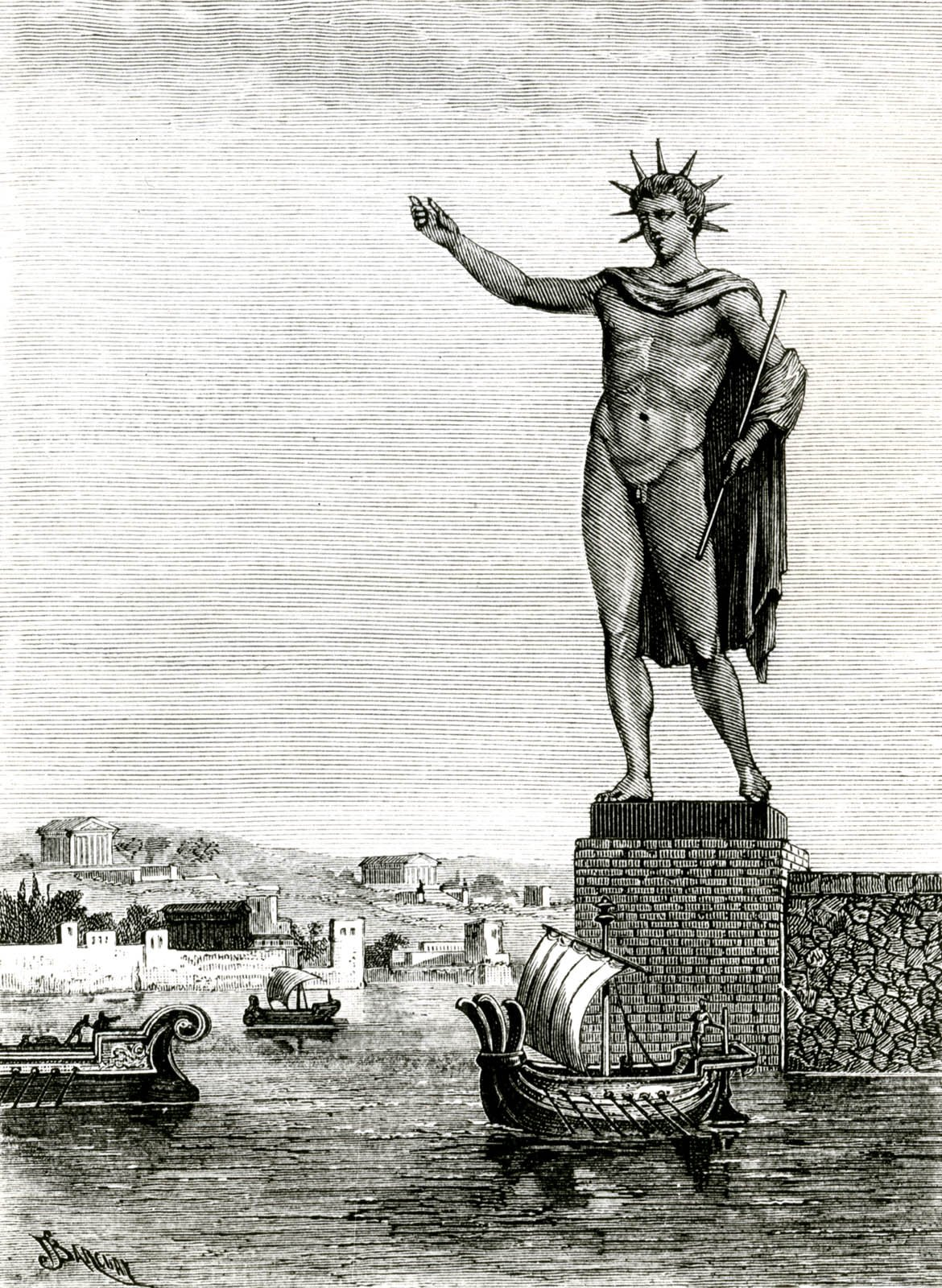
Colossus of Rhodes, artist's impression, 1880

Rule by Athens temporarily brought Attic standard to Rhodian mints. However, after Athenian league's influence waned, Chian standard spread through the Eastern Mediterranean. It is unknown how much Rhodes made an impact on the spread of the Chian standard. Rhodes held a growing economical importance during that period which came after its unification. This weight standard was subsequently known as a Rhodian standard, thus giving a further hint on the leading role of Rhodes.

By the end of the fourth century BC the Aegean region had been dominated by coinage using Attic and Rhodian standards. Early Rhodian standard had replaced Aeginetan standard in silver coinage for most Cycladian mints by the third century BC. By Alexander the Great's time Rhodian standard was accepted by most of Ionia, Caria and by numerous states of the Cyclades and Propontis. Alexander's adoption of the Attic weight brought demise of all other weight standards except for the Attic and Rhodian standards.

Rhodian standard was later notably used in the transition to Phoenician weight by the Ptolemaic Kingdom as it abandoned the Attic weight in favor of its own monetary standard. Ptolemaic use of the Rhodian standard was restricted to an approximate period of c. 310 BC – c. 298 BC.

Early Chian, or Rhodian, standard included tetradrachms and heavier coins. However, later coinage using Rhodian weight evolved with tetradrachms being abandoned in favor of smaller didrachms. Coins lost their weight both before and after the abandonment of the tetradrachms. Early tetradrachms and didrachms were 15.6 g and 7.8 g in weight respectively. They were both replaced in use by later didrachms with the minimum weight of 6.7 g.

There is convincing evidence that Rhodian and Lycian league's plinthophoroi circulated, at least informally, at par on the market, and they have been found together in coin hoards. However, Lycian coinage's weight standard was slightly lighter than Rhodian standard.

== Mints ==
Rhodes itself held the most important mints. Ephesus is notable for holding the most important mint for the Rhodian monetary standard outside of the Rhodian controlled territory.

Naxos minted tetrobols (Rhodian weight drachms) while using Aeginetan standard for other coins. Ios was another island that saw limited usage of the Rhodian standard. It was primarily known for hosting the tomb of Homer. A very small series of didrachms were struck between 350 BC – 320 BC, and they included a portrait and name of Homer on obverse sides of the coins.

== History of Rhodian coinage ==
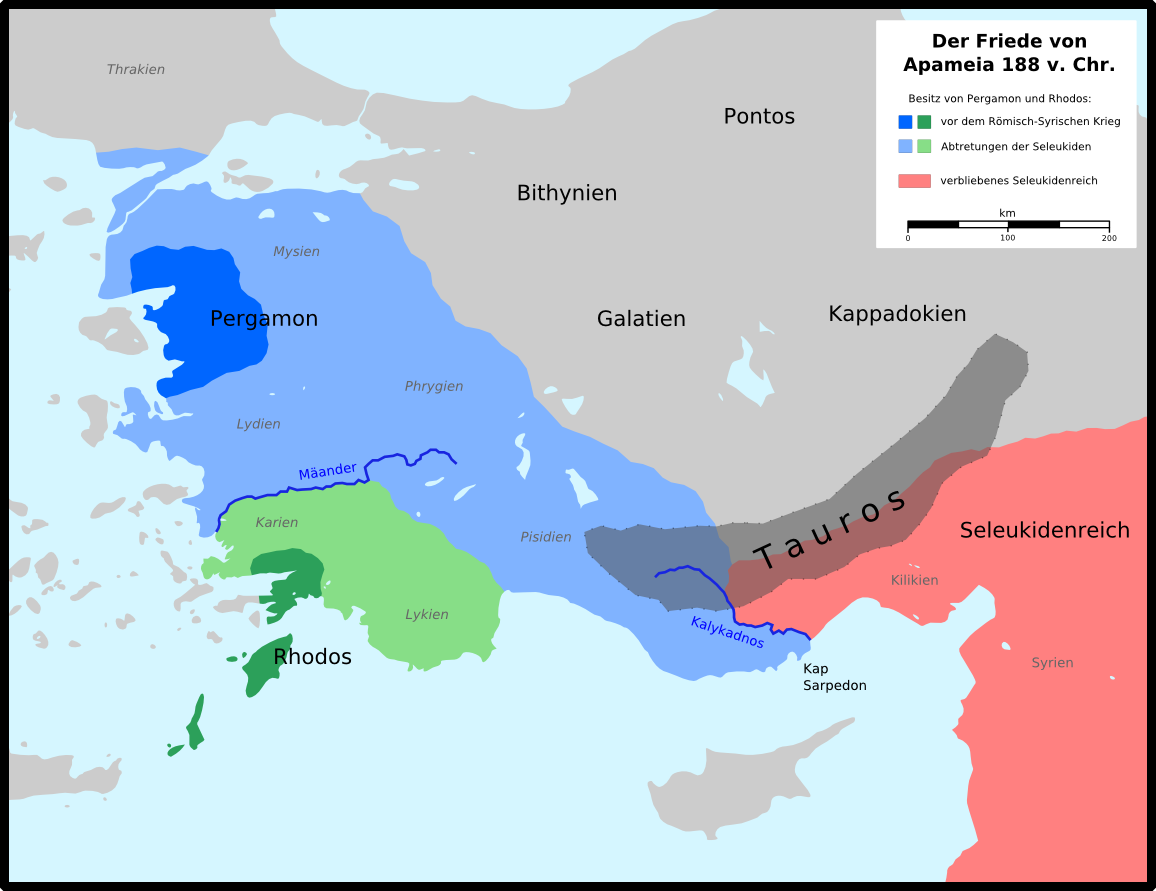
Territory controlled by Rhodes. Rhodian territory is in green (lighter green is territory after the Treaty of Apamea in 188 BC).

Rhodes was a major maritime and mercantile power. For instance, Syrian goods on bound to Egypt made a detour through the island of Rhodes. Rhodians also made large contributions to fight piracy in the region. Rhodes was an ally of the Ptolemaic Kingdom.

Siege of Rhodes (305 BC – 304 BC) by Demetrius I of Macedon resulted in Rhodians gaining wider freedom of action, and ties with Ptolemaic Egypt being strengthened. The siege had been an attempt to break the Rhodo-Egyptian alliance. However, tetradrachms and golden coinage originating from Rhodes disappeared for a considerable length of time. Rhodian didrachms (weighing 6,7g) gained a solid position, with its wide circulation, in the eastern Mediterranean trade. Its atypical weight did not allow the Rhodian didrachm to function as a real international means of exchange. Many Rhodian silver coins were also melted down in Egypt when spent there, and were subsequently struck as Ptolemaic coinage.

Imitations of Rhodian coinage are proven to have circulated between 188 BC and 167 BC in Lycia on the mainland Asia Minor. These forged coins imitated an older variant of Rhodian coinage.

During 88 BC siege of Rhodes by Mithridates VI a possible emergency series of large bronze coinage was struck as a result of the war.

=== End of the local currency ===
The final demise for the Rhodian currency was brought by the late Republican Roman civil wars beginning from the Caesar's Civil War. Many small Hellenistic silver currencies ceased to exist. By 30 BC the Roman monetary system and denarii were clearly dominant in the eastern parts of the Empire.

Rhodes came under direct Roman rule in 31 AD and was merged in the province of Asia in 44 AD.

== Iconography ==
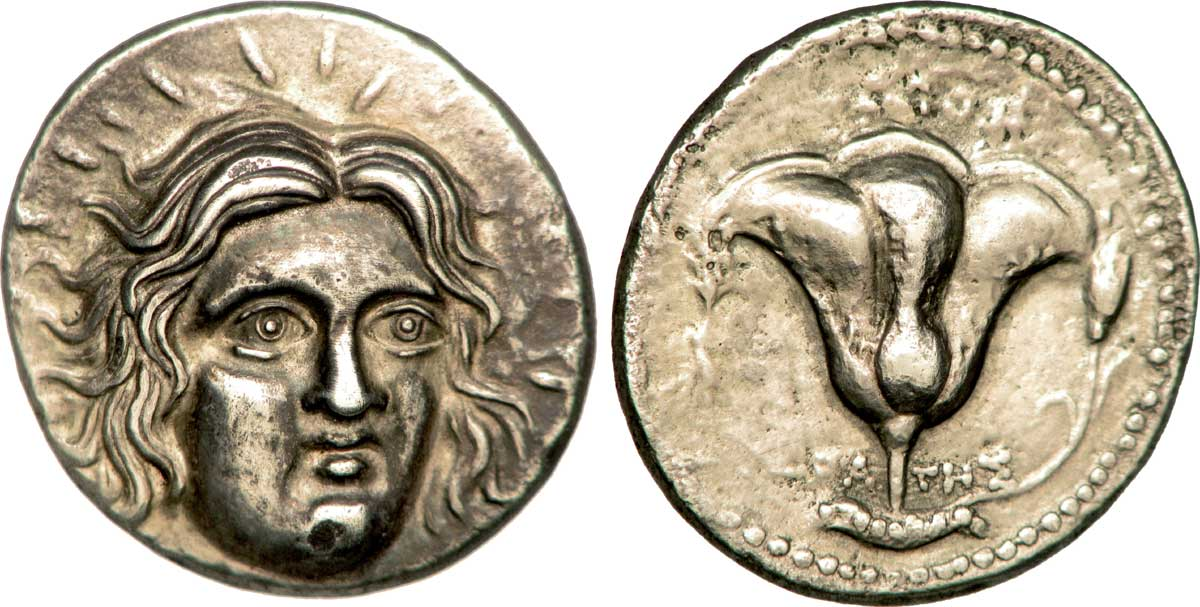
Rhodian tetradrachm portraying the sun god Helios (obverse) and a rose (reverse).

Sun god Helios was the prominent deity for the Rhodians. Several ancient towns claimed descent from the deity. Helios would appear on obverse sides of Rhodian coinage for four centuries. Designs of Rhodian coinage were unaffected by the campaigns of Alexander the Great.

Rhodes used a head of Helios or a rose as their symbol. These symbols were also used in other forms of art, in addition to coinage, such as in stamps of amphorae. Local symbols can be used to determine the origin of an artifact, and in certain cases the symbol refers to the name of the place. The rose refers to Rhodes as a canting symbol (making a pun of the name). One type of Rhodian tetradrachms (see fig. 1) used a ship's prow as a symbol of Rhodian naval might. The prow is more evident from a more complete specimen of the coin, and it is on the left side of the rose which is on reverse side of the coin. On the right side of the rose is a bud. Below the rose is name of the magistrate, and a text above the rose refers to Rhodes. Obverse side of the coin portrays sun god Helios.

Rhodian silver coinage may give hints on the appearance of the Colossus of Rhodes.

== See also ==
- League of the Islanders
- Roman provincial currency
