= Athenian coinage decree =

Athenian currency law

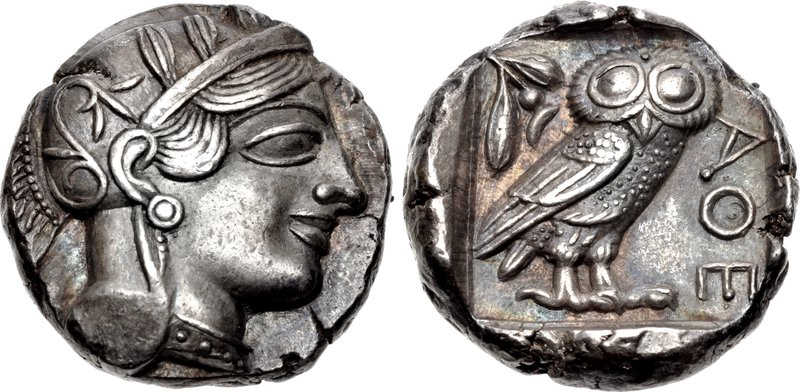
Silver tetradrachm used after 449 BC

The Athenian coinage decree also known as the Standards decree was a decree made by the Athenians to standardise currency amongst the states with whom they were allied. Between the years of 450 and 447 BC, the use of Athenian silver currency and Athenian weights and measures was made obligatory in all allied states of the Athenian Empire.

Scholarly opinion is split in regards to the dating of the Athenian coinage decree. Various fragments from cities allied to Athens have been used to reconstruct the decree. The decree required that all allied currencies be taken out of circulation and melted down to be replaced with Attic coins, with a small difference in the exchange rate favouring Athens; the Athenian mint benefited as the allies’ mints were closed down. This encouraged the flow of trade through the Aegean and especially between Athens and the allied states. However, the measure did impinge upon the autonomy of the allied states. The use of Athenian currency had become increasingly common, especially with smaller states, but many continued to mint their own coins with their own state symbol. The result was that the overall volume of trade in the Aegean increased, but with greater domination by Athens.
