= Attic weight =

One of the monetary standards in ancient Greece

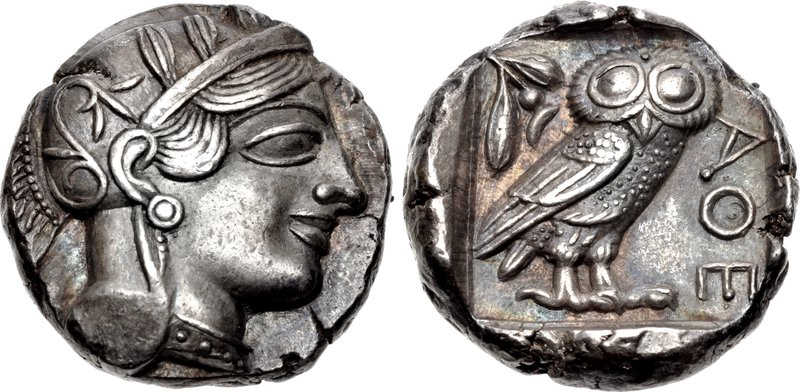
Athenian tetradrachm, minted after 449 BC.

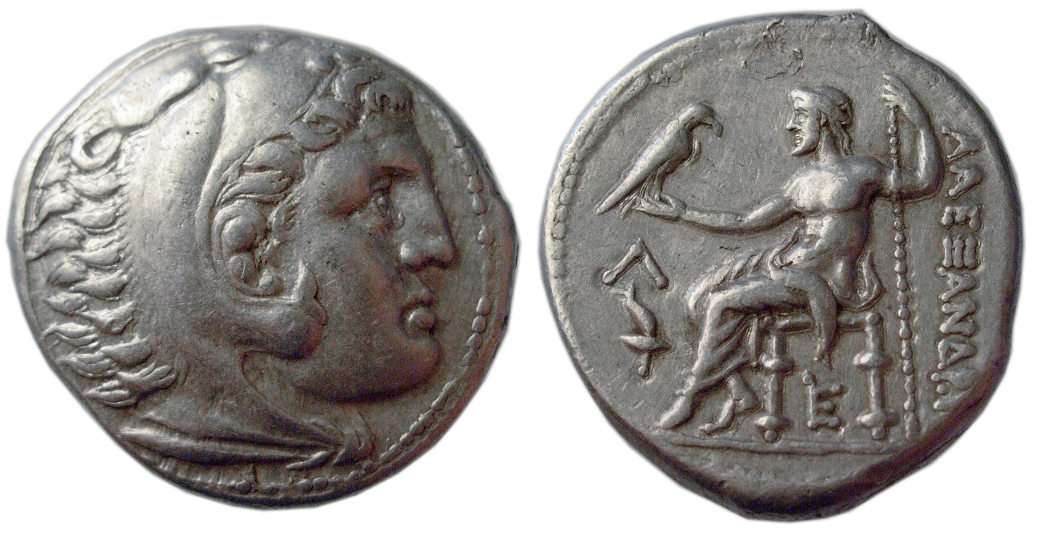
Posthumous tetradrachm of Alexander the Great, minted on the Attic weight at Amphipolis, 315–294 BC.

Attic weight, or the Attic standard, also known as Euboic standard, was one of the main monetary standards in ancient Greece. As a result of its use in the coinage of the Athenian empire and the empire of Alexander the Great, it was the dominant weight standard for coinage issued in the Eastern Mediterranean from the fifth century BC until the introduction of the Roman denarius to the region in the late first century BC.

The Attic weight was based on a drachma of 4.31 grams, but in practice the main denomination was the tetradrachm or four-drachma coin, which weighed approximately 17.26 g in silver. For larger sums, the units of account were the mina (100 drachmae or 435 g), and the talent (6,000 drachmae or 26.1 kg).

In practice, this meant that the Attic weight standard was interchangeable with the Euboic standard used on the island of Euboea, which consisted of a stater of 17.2 g divided into six hektai of 2.86 g. Because of Euboea's role in Greek colonisation in the Archaic period, the latter standard was widespread in the Greek West and Pontic regions.

== History ==
Athenian coinage (and its weight standard) became one of the most important standards in the Aegean region in the Classical period, for a number of reasons. Firstly, the Athenian silver mines at Laurion were the main source of silver in the Aegean. Secondly, the Athenian demand for grain was met by sending large quantities of Athenian coinage to major grain producing regions in Sicily, Egypt, and the Levant. Finally, the Athenian empire may have enforced the use of the Attic weight standard through the Athenian coinage decree.

Philip II of Macedon adopted Attic standard for his kingdom. Alexander the Great also minted on the Attic standard during his reign. The Macedonian Empire's adoption of the Attic weight reinforced its status as the standard weight for trade throughout the eastern Mediterranean. In the Hellenistic period, most kingdoms minted on the standard and the majority of the local weight standards that had existed in earlier times went out of use. There were many exceptions, however. Ptolemaic Egypt, used a lighter weight standard. The island of Rhodes maintained its own Rhodian standard, supported by their role as a commercial hub for the trade in wine and Egyptian grain.

During the 300 years of the Hellenistic period the Attic weight slowly declined, as mints reduced the weight of newly minted coins to match the weight of the worn coins that were already in circulation. At the time of Alexander the Great, the Attic tetradrachm weighed 17.28 g of silver. In 300 BC it had slightly reduced in weight, to 17.20 g. The Seleucid mint at Antioch shows a continuing process of declining weight. The decline can also be seen at other mints.

== Attic trade weight ==
The Attic weight was used only for monetary sums of silver. For the weight of other objects a separate Attic "trade weight" was used, with a mina of 105 drachmae (457 g) – 5% higher than the monetary weight. During the fifth century BC, this became the main weight used in commerce in the Aegean basin and it was also enforced throughout the Athenian empire by the Athenian coinage decree. In the fourth century BC, the Athenians believed that this trade weight had been invented by the lawgiver Solon in 594 BC, but epigraphic evidence shows that it did not exist before around 500 BC. The earliest physical weight on the trade standard seems to have been hurriedly converted from a mina of 100 drachmae in the early fifth century, probably indicating that it was introduced as an emergency measure to reducing the cost of food and other commodities in a moment of crisis – most likely the evacuation of Athens in 480 BC during the Persian Invasion of Greece.

== See also ==
- Attic talent
- List of ancient Greek monetary standards
