= Legacy of the Indo-Greeks =

200 BC–10 AD impact of Greeks in South Asia

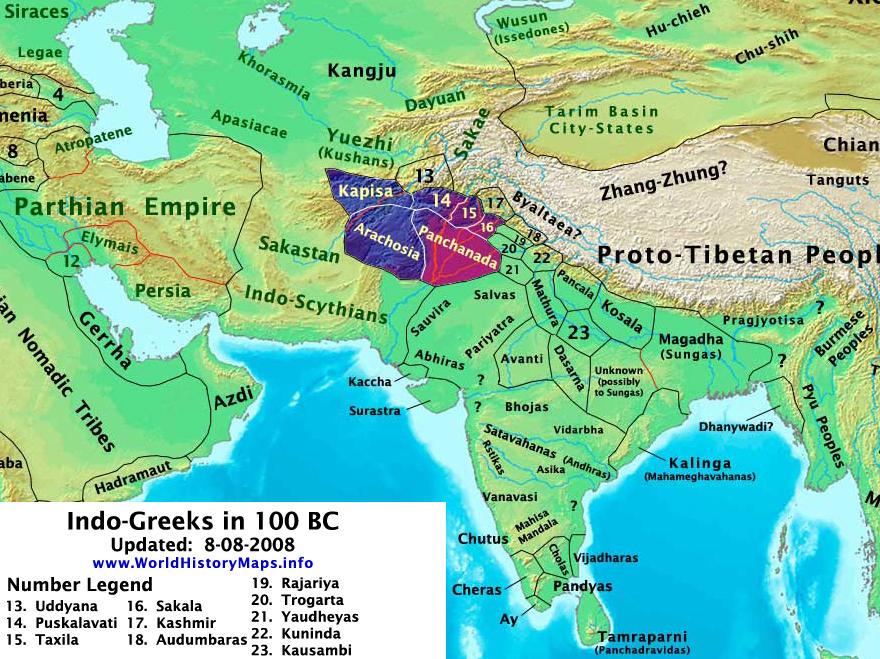
Indo-Greek Kingdoms in 100 BC

The legacy of the Indo-Greeks starts with the formal end of the Indo-Greek Kingdom from the 1st century AD, as the Greek communities of Central Asia and northwestern India lived under the control of the Kushan branch of the Yuezhi, Indo-Scythians and Indo-Parthian Kingdom. The Kushans founded the Kushan Empire, which was to prosper for several centuries. In the south, the Greeks were under the rule of the Scythian Western Kshatrapas.

It is unclear how much longer the Greeks managed to maintain a distinct presence in the Indian subcontinent.

== Society ==
=== Politics ===
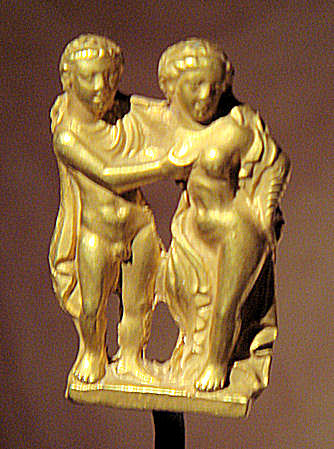
Hellenistic couple from ancient Taxila (Guimet Museum).

The 36 Indo-Greek kings known through epigraphy or through their coins belong to the period between 180 BC to AD10–20. There are a few hints of a later Indo-Greek political presence in the Indian subcontinent. Theodamas, known from an inscription on a signet, may have been an Indo-Greek ruler in the Bajaur area in the 1st century AD. In the 3rd century, the Scythian Western Satraps seem to have relied on Greeks, such as Yavanesvara ("Lord of the Greeks"), who may have been organized in more or less independent poleis.

Some sort of Greek political organization is thought to have existed in the first half of the 4th century after the rule of the Satavahanas. This is also suggested by the Puranas (the Matsya Purana, the Vayu Purana, the Brahmanda Purana, the Vishnu Purana, the Bhagavata Purana) which give a list of the dynasties who ruled following the decline of the Satavahanas: this list includes 8 Yavana kings, thought to be some dynasty of Greek descent, although they are not otherwise known. According to one theory however, the Southern Indian dynasty of the Chalukyas was named after "Seleukia" (the Seleucids), their conflict with the Pallava of Kanchi being but a continuation of the conflict between ancient Seleukia and "Parthians", the proposed ancestors of Pallavas. Dr. Lewis's theory, based on the mere similarity of names, has not found acceptance at all because the Pallavas were in constant conflict with the Kadambas, prior to the rise of Chalukyas.

=== Cities ===
Some Greek cities seem to have remained intact under Parthian rule: Isidorus of Charax in his 1st century AD "Parthian stations" itinerary described "Alexandropolis, the metropolis of Arachosia" as being Greek:

"Beyond is Arachosia (Old Persian Hara[h]uvati, Avestan Haraxvaiti)). And the Parthians call this White India; there are the city of Biyt and the city of Pharsana and the city of Chorochoad (Haraxvat) and the city of Demetrias; then Alexandropolis, the metropolis of Arachosia; it is Greek, and by it flows the river Arachotus (Harahvati). As far as this place the land is under the rule of the Parthians."

— "Parthians stations", 1st century AD. Original text in paragraph 19 of Parthian stations

Also, the city of Alexandria Bucephalus on the Jhelum River is still mentioned in the 1st century Periplus of the Erythraean Sea, as well as in the Roman Peutinger Table.

=== Military ===
Greek mercenary soldiers from northwestern India are mentioned in the accounts of the Pandyan Kingdom in Madurai, and described in admiring terms: "The valiant-eyed Yavanas, whose bodies were strong and of terrible aspect".

At the beginning of the 2nd century, the Central India Satavahana king Gautamiputra Satakarni (r. 106–130) was described as the "Destroyer of Sakas (Western Kshatrapas), Yavanas (Indo-Greeks) and Pahlavas (Indo-Parthians)" in his inscriptions, suggesting a continued presence of the Indo-Greeks until that time.

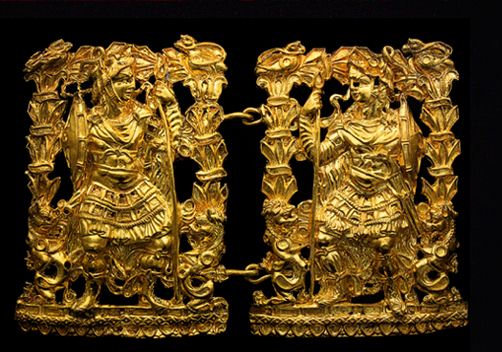
Men in Greek uniform, Tillia Tepe, 1st century CE (Guimet Museum).

Around 200 AD, the Manu Smriti describes the downfall of the Yavanas, as well as many others:

"43. But in consequence of the omission of the sacred rites, and of their not consulting Brahmanas, the following tribes of Kshatriyas have gradually sunk in this world to the condition of Shudras;
44. (Viz.) the Paundrakas, the Chodas, the Dravidas, the Kambojas, the Yavanas, the Shakas, the Paradas, the Pahlavas, the Chinas, the Kiratas, the Daradas and the Khashas." (Manusmritti, X.43–44)

There are important references to the warring Mleccha hordes of the Yavanas, Sakas, Kambojas, Pahlavas, etc. in the Bala Kanda of the Valmiki Ramayana.

Indologists like Dr H. C. Raychadhury, Dr B. C. Law, Satya Shrava and others see, in these verses, the clear glimpses of the struggles of the Hindus with the mixed invading hordes of the barbaric Sakas, Yavanas, Pahlavas, Kambojas, etc. from north-west. The time frame for these struggles is the 2nd century BCE downwards. Dr Raychadhury fixes the date of the present version of the Valmiki Ramayana around/after the 2nd century CE.

There is also a distinct prophetic statement in the Mahabharata which says that the Mlechha (Barbaric) kings of the Sakas, Yavanas, Kambojas, Bahlikas, Abhiras, etc. will rule unrighteously in Kali Yuga.

According to Dr H. C. Ray Chaudhury, this is too clear a statement to be ignored or explained away.

This statement, couched in the form of prophecy in true puranic style, alludes to a historical situation (2nd and 1st century BC downwards) which followed the collapse of Maurya and Shunga dynasties in North India. ' This chaotic situation of Aryan India is said to have ended with the destruction of these Mlechcha Saka, Kamboja, Yavana and Parsika hordes by king Vikramaditya of Ujjaini (c. 60 BC) as is related by Brihat-Katha-Manjari of the Kashmiri Pandit Kshemendra and Kathasaritsagara of Somadeva, and the establishment of the Vikrama era.

=== Trade ===
Although the political power of the Greeks had waned in the north, mainly due to nomadic invasions, trade relations between the Mediterranean and India continued for several centuries. The trade started by Eudoxus of Cyzicus in 130 BCE kept on increasing, and according to Strabo (II.5.12), by the time of Augustus, up to 120 ships were setting sail every year from Myos Hormos to India. So much gold was used for this trade, and apparently recycled by the Kushans for their own coinage, that Pliny (NH VI.101) complained about the drain of specie to India. In practice, this trade was still handled by Greek middlemen, as all the recorded names of ship captains for the period are Greek.

Also various exchanges are recorded between India and Rome during this period. In particular, embassies from India, as well as several missions from "Sramanas" to the Roman emperors are known (see Buddhism and the Roman world). Finally, Roman goods and works of art found their way to the Kushans, as archaeological finds in Begram have confirmed.

=== Genetics ===
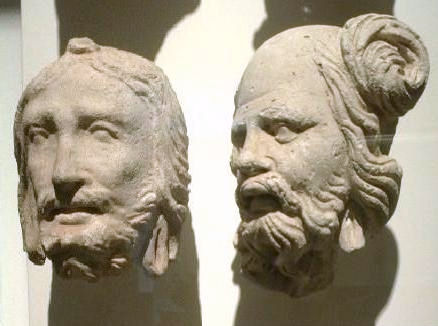
Portraits from the site of Hadda, 3rd century CE (Guimet Museum).

Limited population genetics studies have been made on genetic markers such as Y-DNA in the populations of the Indian subcontinent, in order to estimate the contribution of the Greeks to the genetic pool. Studies have not found the markers which are present in a large proportion of Greeks today.

"The political influence of Seleucid and Bactrian dynastic Greeks over northwest India, for example, persisted for several centuries after the invasion of the army of Alexander the Great (Tarn 1951). However, we have not found, in Punjab or anywhere else in India, Y chromosomes with the M170 or M35 mutations that together account for 30% in Greeks and Macedonians today (Semino et al. 2000). Given the sample size of 325 Indian Y chromosomes examined, however, it can be said that the Greek homeland (or European, more generally, where these markers are spread) contribution has been 0%–3% for the total population or 0%–15% for Punjab in particular. Such broad estimates are preliminary, at best. It will take larger sample sizes, more populations, and increased molecular resolution to determine the likely modest impact of historic gene flows to India on its pre-existing large populations."

— Kivisild et al. "Origins of Indian Casts and Tribes".

Some Romani people groups, claimed to be descendants of the Athinganoi, who are said to be the remnants of the Indo-Greeks. DNA studies of Romani people,

== Culture ==
=== Art ===
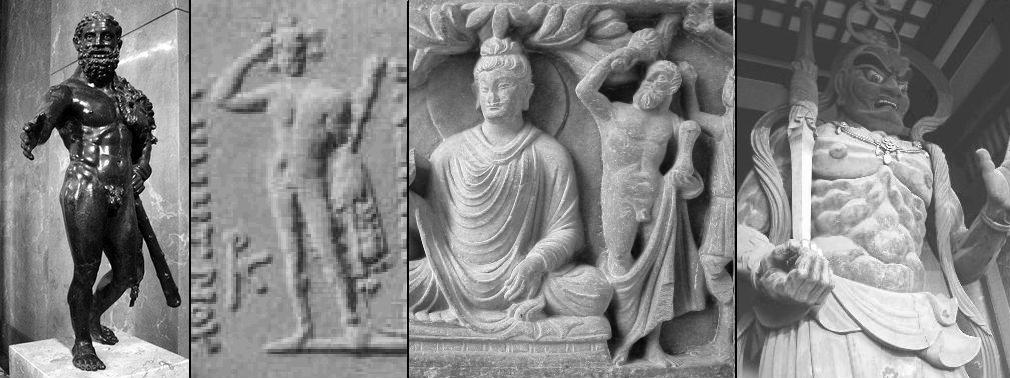
Iconographical evolution from the Greek god Herakles to the Japanese god Shukongōshin. From left to right: 1) Herakles (Louvre Museum). 2) Herakles on coin of Greco-Bactrian king Demetrius I. 3) Vajrapani, the protector of the Buddha, depicted as Herakles in the Greco-Buddhist art of Gandhara. 4) Shukongōshin, manifestation of Vajrapani, as protector deity of Buddhist temples in Japan.

The "Kanishka casket", dated to the first year of Kanishka's reign in 127 CE, was signed by a Greek artist named Agesilas, who oversaw work at Kanishka's stupas (caitya), confirming the direct involvement of Greeks with Buddhist realizations at such a late date.

Greek representations and artistic styles, with some possible admixtures from the Roman world, continued to maintain a strong identity down to the 3rd–4th century, as indicated by the archaeological remains of such sites as Hadda in eastern Afghanistan.

The Greco-Buddhist image of the Buddha was transmitted progressively through Central Asia and China until it reached Japan in the 6th century.

Numerous elements of Greek mythology and iconography, introduced in northwestern India by the Indo-Greeks through their coinage at the very least, were then adopted throughout Asia within a Buddhist context, especially along the Silk Road. The Japanese Buddhist deity Shukongoshin, one of the wrath-filled protector deities of Buddhist temples in Japan, is an interesting case of transmission of the image of the famous Greek god Herakles to the Far-East along the Silk Road. The image of Herakles was introduced in India with the coinage of Demetrius and several of his successors, used in Greco-Buddhist art to represent Vajrapani the protector of the Buddha, and was then used in Central Asia, China and Japan to depict the protector gods of Buddhist temples.

=== Religion ===
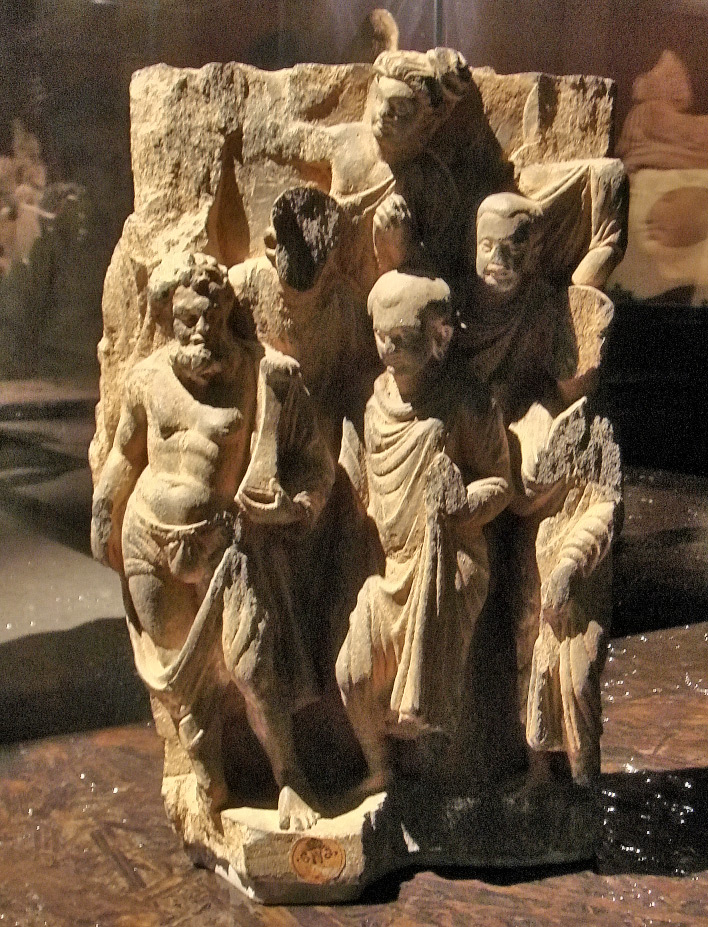
The Zeus-like Vajrapani was chosen as a protector of the Buddha, art of Gandhara, (Guimet Museum).

The impact of the Indo-Greeks on Indian thought and religion is unknown, although many influences have been suggested. Initially Greek settlers followed a pantheon of gods and goddesses assimilating with other deities. For example, Eucratides I depicted coinage with Zeus/Indra riding Airavata. Buddhism was spread to Greek communities by the Mauryan Emperor Ashoka. Scholars believe that Mahayana Buddhism began around the 1st century BCE in the northwestern Indian subcontinent, corresponding to the time and place of Indo-Greek florescence. Intense multi-cultural influences have indeed been suggested in the appearance of Mahayana.

== Linguistic legacy ==
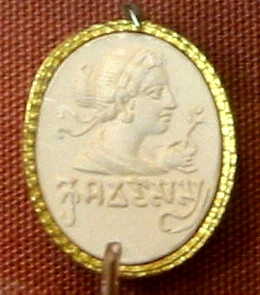
A Greco-Roman-style carnelian seal from the Punjab region, with Brahmi inscription "Kusumadasasya" ("Flower-Servant"). 4–5th century CE. British Museum.

A few Greek words were adopted in Sanskrit, such as words chiefly related to warfare and numeration:

- "bridle", (Sanskrit: khalina, Greek: χαλινός "khalinos")
- "center" (Sanskrit: kendra, Greek: κέντρον "kentron")
- "syringe" (Sanskrit: surungā, suranga, Greek: σύριγγα "syringa")
- "pen" (Sanskrit: kalama, Greek: κάλαμος "kalamos")

The "Avaca" Kharosthi inscription, found on a Buddhist relic casket, indicates that the old Greek military title of strategos ("commander") had apparently endured the Indo-Scythian invasion and was being used by the Apracarajas of Bajaur during the 1st century CE (the inscription mentions the dedication date of the casket as "the year 63 of the late Maharaja Aya", Aya being the Indo-Scythian ruler Azes I, who started the Vikrama era in 58 BCE, therefore suggesting a date around 5 CE). The dedication mentions "vaga stratego puyaite viyayamitro ya" i.e. "The Lord Commander (Stratega) Viyayamitra is honored too".

The Greek philosopher Apollonius of Tyana is related by Philostratus in Life of Apollonius Tyana to have visited India, and specifically the city of Taxila around 46 CE. He describes constructions of the Greek type, probably referring to Sirkap, and explains that the Indo-Parthian king of Taxila, named Phraotes, received a Greek education at the court of his father and spoke Greek fluently:

"Ancient Indian and Indo-Greek theater" by M.L. Varadpande explores the Indo-Greek interaction in the theatrical arts.

"Tell me, O King, how you acquired such a command of the Greek tongue, and whence you derived all your philosophical attainments in this place?"
[...]-"My father, after a Greek education, brought me to the sages at an age somewhat too early perhaps, for I was only twelve at the time, but they brought me up like their own son; for any that they admit knowing the Greek tongue they are especially fond of, because they consider that in virtue of the similarity of his disposition he already belongs to themselves."

Lastly, from the Rabatak inscription we have the following information, tending to indicate that Greek was still in official use until the time of Kanishka (c. 120 CE):

"He (Kanishka) issued(?) an edict(?) in Greek and then he put it into the Aryan language". ...but when Kanishka refers to "the Aryan language" he surely means Bactrian, ..."By the grace of Auramazda, I made another text in Aryan, which previously did not exist". It is difficult not to associate Kanishka's emphasis here on the use of the "Aryan language" with the replacement of Greek by Bactrian on his coinage. The numismatic evidence shows that this must have taken place very early in Kanishka's reign, ..." — Prof. Nicholas Sims-Williams (University of London).

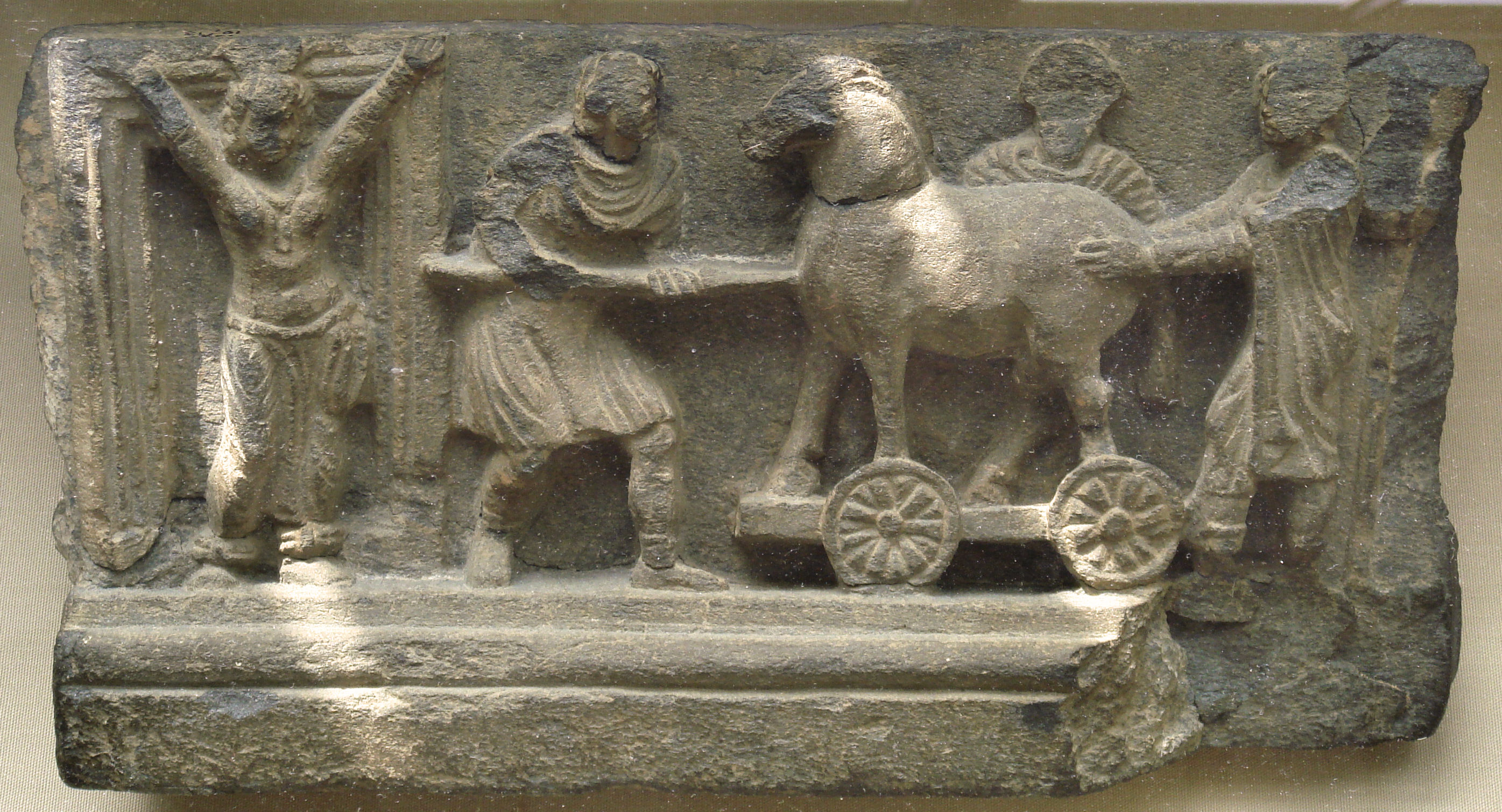
The story of the Trojan horse was depicted in the art of Gandhara. British Museum.

== Calendar ==
=== Yona Era ===
A Greek "Yona" calendar era seems to have been in use in Northwestern Indian for several centuries following the foundation of the Indo-Greek kingdom. A recently discovered inscription in Kharoshthi on a Buddhist reliquary gives a relationship between several eras of the period:

"In the twenty-seventh - 27 - year in the reign of Lord Vijayamitra, the King of the Apraca; in the seventy-third - 73 - year which is called "of Azes", in the two hundred and first - 201 - year of the Yonas (Greeks), on the eighth day of the month of Sravana; on this day was established [this] stupa by Rukhana, the wife of the King of Apraca, [and] by Vijayamitra, the king of Apraca, [and] by Indravarma (Indravasu?), the commander (stratega), [together] with their wives and sons."

The Yona era would correspond to 186 BCE, which falls in the reign of Demetrius I, although dates ranging from 186 to 150 BCE are still debated. The inscription would date to c. 15 CE.

The Yona Calendar was replaced by the Saka calendar, after their consolidation of power. The Indian national calendar is also called the Shalivahana Shaka (Saka) calendar due to its years being counted in the Saka era. Starting with the reign of Chashtana the Saka era is dated as year 0. The Azes era initiated by the Saka King Azes I was used alongside the Vikrama era starting in 58 BCE,

A second inscription, called the Maghera inscription, found in the Mathura district, is dated to the year 116 of the "Era of the Greeks" ("Yavanarajyasya sodasuttare varsasate 100 10 6), which would correspond to 70 BCE.

=== Macedonian Calendar ===
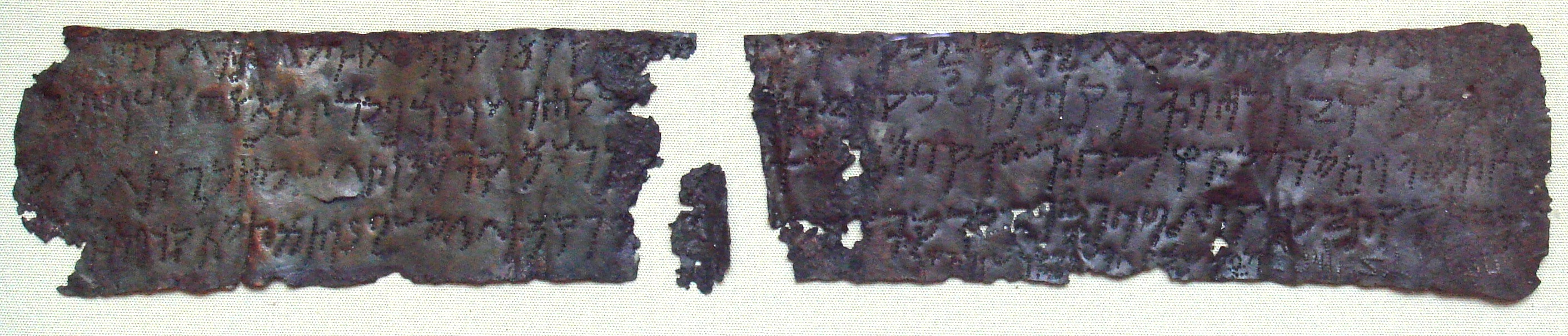
The Indo-Scythian Taxila copper plate uses the Macedonian month of "Panemos" for calendrical purposes (British Museum).

The names of the months belonging to the Ancient Macedonian calendar remained in use under the Indo-Scythians and the Kushans until around the 2nd century CE. For example the Indo-Scythian Taxila copper plate inscription uses the Macedonian month of "Panemos". Later, the Dast-i Nawur inscription mentioning the Kushan king Vima Kadphises (reigned circa 90–100 CE) is dated to the 279th year (possibly in the Yona era, which would make it 93 CE, but alternatively in "the Great Arya era" mentioned by Kanishka in the Rabatak inscription, possibly an era started by Mithridates I which would give 108 CE), and the 15th day of the month of "Gorpaios" (Γορπιαίος), which is the 11th month of the Macedonian calendar, corresponding to the moon of August.

== Astronomy and astrology ==
One of the earliest Indian writings on astronomy and astrology, titled the Yavanajataka or "The Saying of the Greeks", is a translation from Greek to Sanskrit made by "Yavanesvara" ("Lord of the Greeks") in 149–150 CE under the rule of the Indo-Scythian king Rudrakarman I of the Western Satraps. The Yavanajataka contains instructions on calculating astrological charts (horoscopes) from the time and place of one's birth. Astrology flourished in the Hellenistic world (particularly Alexandria) and the Yavanajataka reflecting advancements in astrological techniques. Various astronomical and mathematical methods, such as the calculation of the 'horoskopos' (the zodiac sign on the eastern horizon), were used in the service of astrology. The related Paulisa Siddhanta, and Romaka Siddhanta are also attributed to Greek and Greko-Roman authorship. The Indo-Scythians would utilize astrology to form the Saka calendar and its corresponding horoscopes, which is still used today as the Indian national calendar.

== See also ==
- Similarities between Pyrrhonism and Indian philosophy
- Theory of Pashtun descent from ancient Greek-Rajputs
- Kalash people
