= Roman provincial currency =

Roman provincial currency was coinage minted within the Roman Empire by local civic rather than imperial authorities. These coins were often continuations of the original currencies that existed prior to the arrival of the Romans. Because so many of them were minted in the Greek areas of the empire, they were usually referred to until fairly recently as Greek imperial coinage, and catalogued at the end of lists of coins minted by the Greek cities.

When a new region was assimilated into the Roman Empire, the continuance of preexisting local currencies was often allowed as a matter of expediency. Also, new colonies were frequently given authority to mint bronze coins. These provincial currencies were mostly used by the local inhabitants only for local trade, as their intrinsic values were usually much lower than Roman imperial coinage.

== Characteristics ==
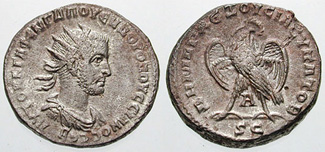
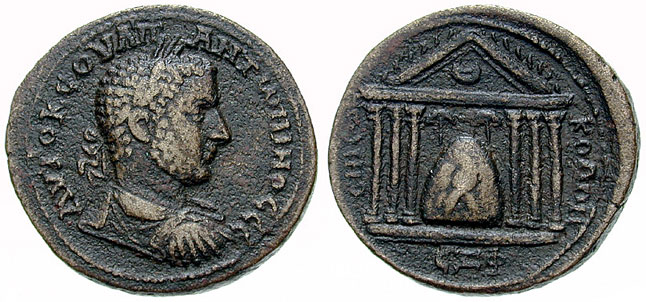
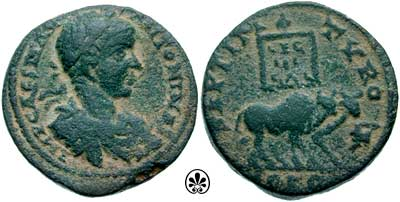
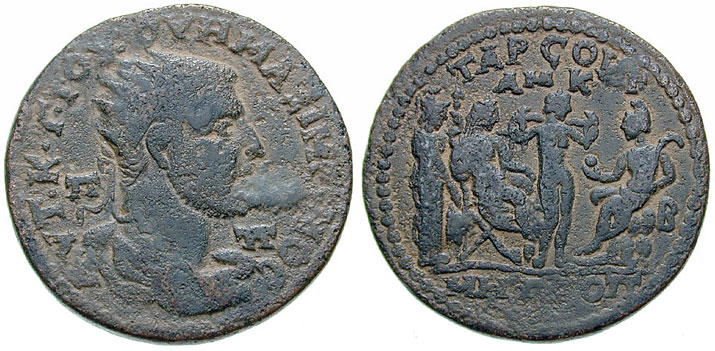
Top left: Silver tetradrachm of Volusianus. From Antioch.
Top right: Coin of the usurper Uranius Antoninus. From Emesa.
Bottom left: Coin of Elagabalus. From Tyre.
Bottom right: Coin of Maximinus Thrax. From Tarsus.

Provincial coins were issued in silver, billon and bronze denominations, though rarely in gold. The majority were bronze. Silver and billon coins were more common in the Eastern regions of the Empire, particularly Alexandria. In general, the issuance of silver coinage was controlled by Rome. That gave the imperial government a measure of control and influence throughout the empire. Some coins that circulated in the eastern parts of the empire may have been minted at the mint of Rome.

== Issuance ==
By 210 BC Rome was controlling all of the Greek cities in the region of Magna Graecia. At the beginning of the next century a clear Roman influence on the Greek coinage can be noticed. Both iconography and style of the coins had changed. Greek coinage from this period can be classified as the first instances of Roman provincial currency.

There were over 600 provincial mints in the imperial era. The mints were located throughout the empire, with a particular concentration in the eastern portions of the empire.

Major provincial cities such as Corinth or Antioch possessed their own minting capabilities. Some mints issued only for their cities (Viminacium) while others issued coins for entire province (e.g. Moesia). There are several cities known by their coins, as there is no historical mention of them.

== Gallery ==
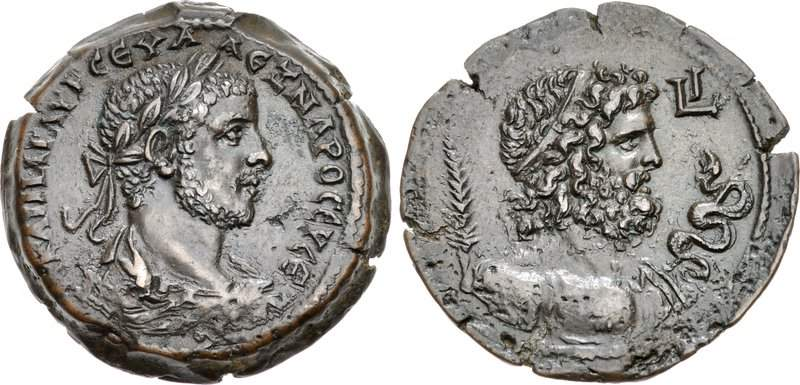
Drachma of Alexandria. Obverse: Bust of Severus Alexander, 222-235 AD. Reverse: Bust of Asclepius.

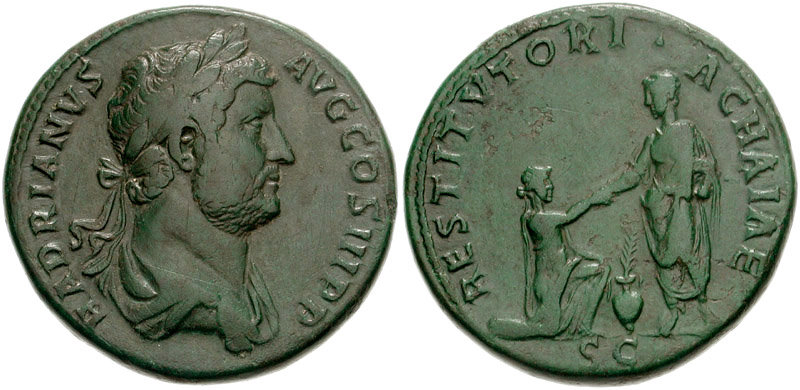
Hadrian coin celebrating the province of Achaia

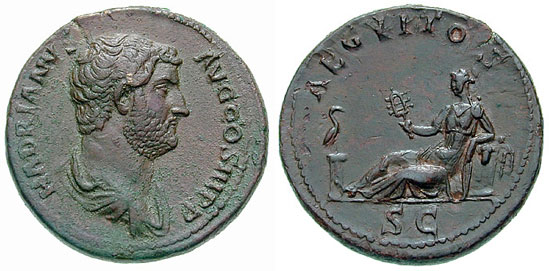
Hadrian coin celebrating the province of Aegyptus

== See also ==
- List of historical currencies
- Roman currency
- Roman Republican currency
