= Mina (unit) =

Ancient Near Eastern unit of weight

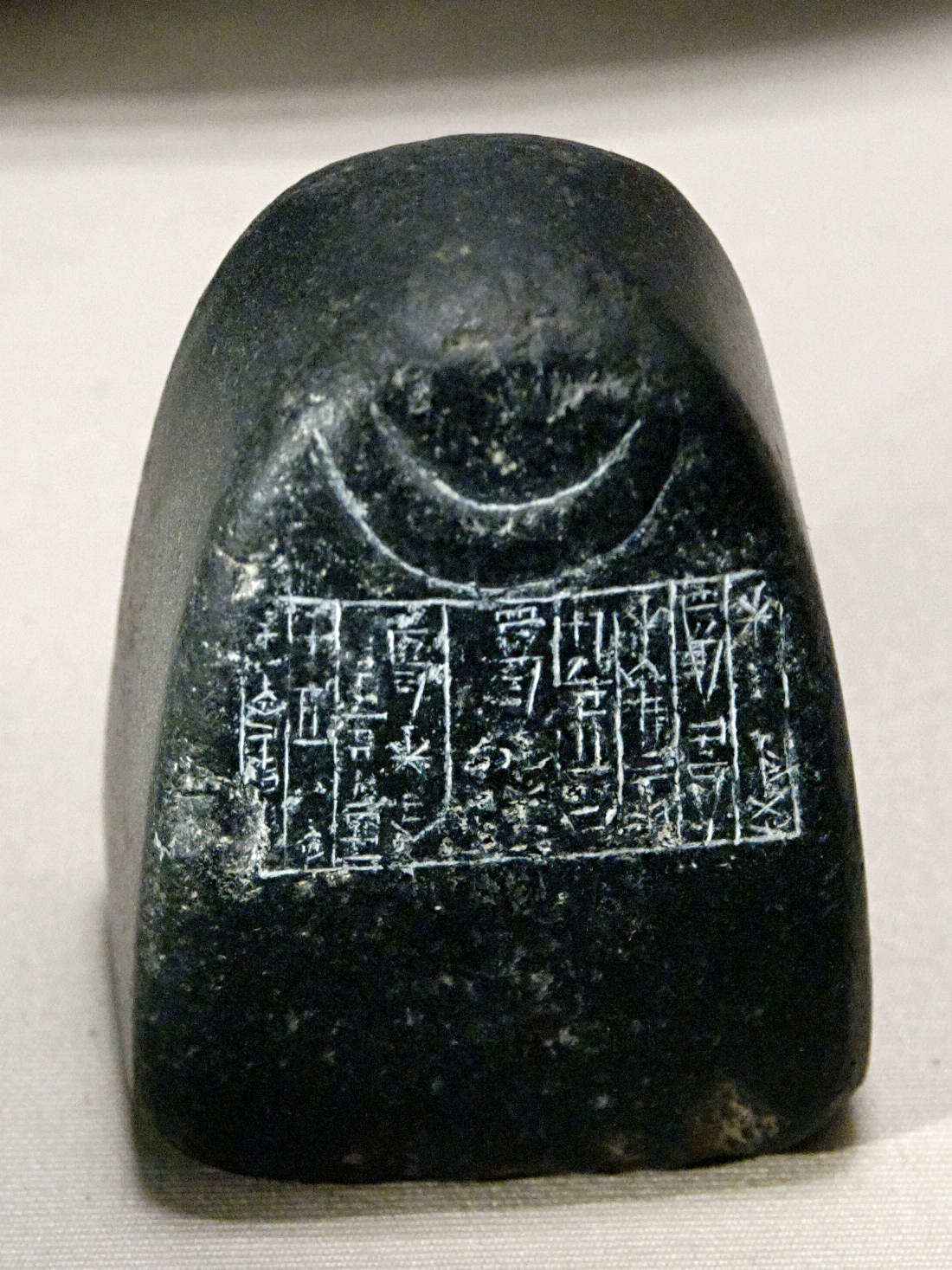
Measurement of ½ mina (actual weight 248 grams), a weight standard established by the Sumerian king Shulgi. It has a crescent image; used in the temple of the god Sin in Ur, diorite, 6.2 by 4.5 centimetres (2.4 in × 1.8 in), early 21st century B.C. (III dynasty of Ur).

The mina /ˈmaɪnə/ (Akkadian: 𒈠𒈾, romanized: manû; Ugaritic: 𐎎𐎐, romanized: mn; Imperial Aramaic: מְנֵא, romanized: mənēʾ; Hebrew: מָנֶה, romanized: māneh; (Note: In the Hebrew tradition, a maneh had always the weight of 100 silver denarii.) Classical Syriac: ܡܢܝܐ, romanized: manyāʾ; Ancient Greek: μνᾶ, romanized: mnā; Latin: mina) is an ancient Near Eastern unit of weight for silver or gold, equivalent to approximately 1.25 pounds (0.57 kg), which was divided into 60 shekels. The mina, like the shekel, eventually also became a unit of currency.

== History ==
=== Sumerian ===
From earliest Sumerian times, a mina was a unit of weight. At first, talents and shekels had not yet been introduced. By the time of Ur-Nammu (shortly before 2000 BCE), the mina had a value of 1/60 talent as well as 60 shekels. The weight of this mina is calculated at 1.25 pounds (0.57 kg), or 570 grams of silver (18 troy ounces).

=== Semitic languages ===
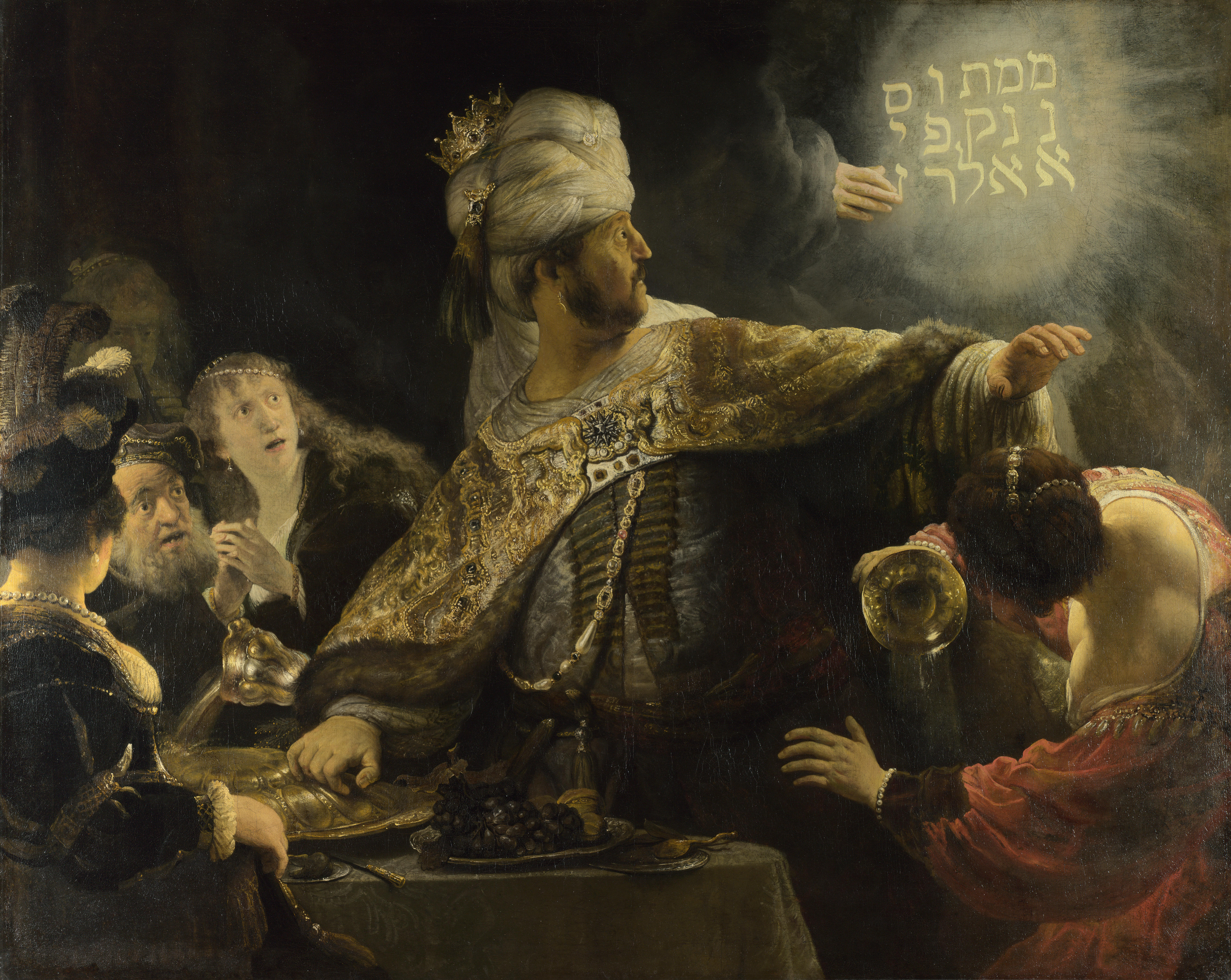
Belshazzar's Feast, (Rembrandt, c. 1635–1638). The message mene, mene, tekel, upharsin is written in vertical lines starting at the top right corner.

The word mina comes from the ancient Semitic root m-n-w/m-n-y 'to count', Akkadian manû, Hebrew: מָנָה (mana), Imperial Aramaic: מָנָה/מְנָא (mana/mena), Classical Syriac: ܡܢܳܐ (mena), Ugaritic: 𐎎𐎐, romanized: mn. It is mentioned in the Bible, where Solomon is reported to have made 300 shields, each with 3 "mina" of gold (Hebrew: מָנֶה, romanized: mane), or later after the Edict of Cyrus II of Persia the people are reported to have donated 5000 minas of silver for the reconstruction of Solomon's Temple in Jerusalem.

In the Code of Hammurabi which is considered one of the first examples of written law, the mina is one of the most used terms denoting the weight of gold to be paid for crimes or to resolve civil conflicts.

In the Biblical story of Belshazzar's feast, the words mene, mene, tekel, upharsin appear on the wall (Daniel 5:25), which according to one interpretation can mean "mina, mina, shekel, and half-pieces", although Daniel interprets the words differently for King Belshazzar.

Writings from Ugarit give the value of a mina as equivalent to fifty shekels. The prophet Ezekiel refers to a mina (maneh in the King James Version) also as 60 shekels, in the Book of Ezekiel 45:12. Jesus of Nazareth tells the "parable of the minas" in Luke 19:11–27, also told as the "parable of the talents" in Matthew 25:14–30. In later Jewish usage, the maneh is equal in weight to 100 denarii.

From the Akkadian period, 2 mina was equal to 1 sila of water (cf. clepsydra, water clock).

=== Greek ===
In ancient Greece, the mina was known as the μνᾶ (mnâ). It originally equalled 70 drachmae but later, at the time of the statesman Solon (c. 594 BC), was increased to 100 drachmae. The Greek word mna (μνᾶ) was borrowed from Semitic. Different city states used minae of different weights. The Aeginetan mina weighed 623.7 g (22.00 oz). The Attic mina weighed 436.6 g (15.40 oz). In Solon's day, according to Plutarch, the price of a sheep was one drachma or a medimnos (about 40 kg) of wheat. Thus a mina was worth 100 sheep.

=== Latin ===
The word mina also occurs in Latin literature, but mainly in plays of Plautus and Terence adapted from Greek originals. In Terence's play Heauton Timorumenos, adapted from a play of the same name by the Greek playwright Menander, a certain sum of money is referred to in one place as "ten minae" (line 724) and in another as "1000 drachmas of silver" (line 601). Usually the word mina referred to a mina of silver, but Plautus also twice mentions a mina of gold. In the 4th century BC, gold was worth about 10 times the same weight of silver. In Plautus, 20 minae is mentioned as the price of buying a slave. It was also the price of hiring a courtesan for a year. 40 minae is given as the price of a house.

In classical Latin the approximate equivalent of a mina was the libra (the word also meant "balance" or "weighing scales"). With a weight of only 328.9 g (11.60 oz), however, the Roman libra was lighter than either a Greek mina or a modern pound of 16 ounces. It was divided into 12 Roman ounces. Sometimes the word libra was used together with the word pondo "in weight", e.g. libram pondo "a pound in weight" (Livy, 3.29); but often pondo was used alone; e.g. auri quinque pondo "five (pounds) in weight of gold" (Cicero, pro Cluentio 179). Hence the word pondo by itself came to mean "pound(s)". From Latin pondo comes the English word "pound", and from libra come the abbreviations "lb" (for weight) and the pound sign "£" (for money).

== Images ==
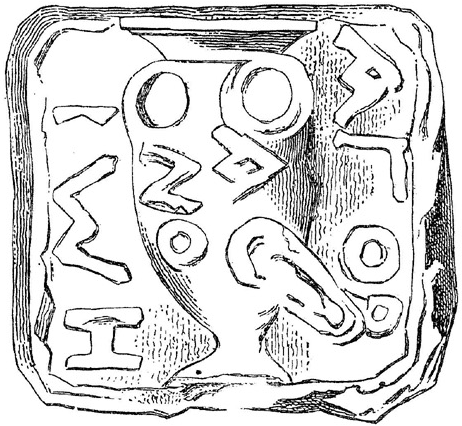
Mina of Athens.

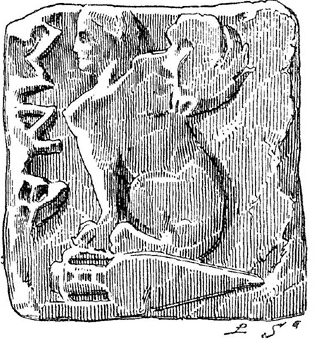
Mina of Chios.

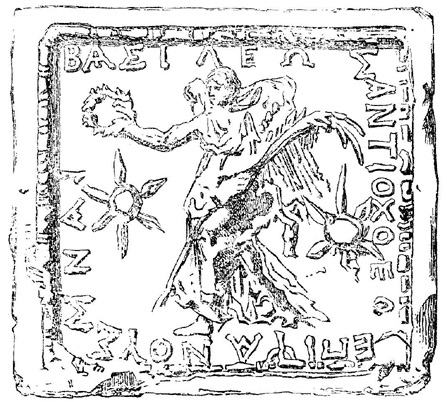
Mina of Antiochus IV Epiphanes.

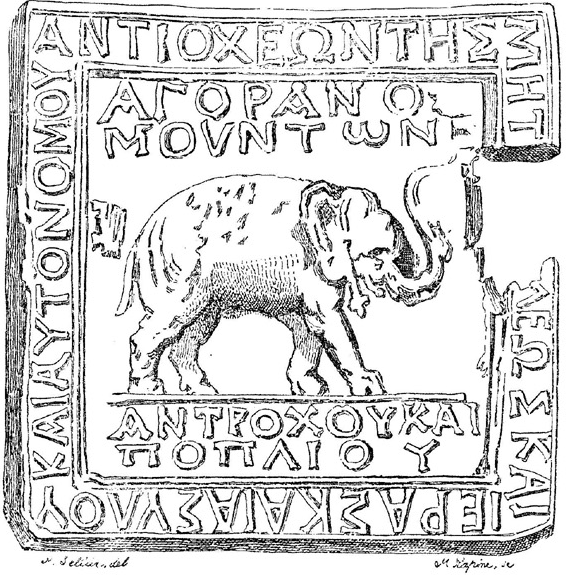
Mina of Antioch.
