= Attalis =

Attalis (Ancient Greek: Ἀτταλίς) was a tribe (phyle) added by the ancient Athenians to the previous list of 11 Athenian tribes in the spring of 200 B.C. just a few months after the "Macedonian" tribes Antigonis and Demetrias were dissolved. The tribe was named after Attalos I, King of Pergamon, on occasion of his visit to Athens.

The Monument of the Eponymous Heroes had two statues (of the Macedonian kings Antigonos I and Demetrios I) removed and one, for Attalos, added, starting the so-called Period IV.

The Athenians placed the phyle on the 12th and last place of their list (three centuries later they were moved to the 13th place with introduction of Adrianis), but modern researchers use the Roman numeral XIV to designate Attalis.

The 12 demes that formed Attalis were collected from all 11 existing tribes ("rule-of-one"), with the twelfth, Apollonieis, newly created and named after Apollonis of Cyzicus, wife of Attalos I.

== Sources ==
- Bates, F.O. (1898). The Five Post-Kleisthenean Tribes. Cornell studies in classical philology. Vol. VIII. Press of Andrus & Church.
- Mattusch, C.C. (1996). Classical Bronzes: The Art and Craft of Greek and Roman Statuary. Cornell University Press. ISBN 978-0-8014-3182-1.
- Traill, John S. (1975). The Political Organization of Attica: A Study of the Demes, Trittyes, and Phylai, and Their Representation in the Athenian Council. Hesperia Supplements. Vol. 14. doi:10.2307/1353928. JSTOR 1353928.
