= Apollonieis =

Apollonieis (Ancient Greek: Ἀπολλωνιεῖς) was a deme of ancient Attica, of the phyle of Attalis, sending five delegates to the Athenian Boule. It was established in 200 BCE and named after Apollonis of Cyzicus, wife of Attalus I.

Its site is unlocated.
