= Battle of the Caecus River =

3rd century BC battle between Pergamon and the Galatians

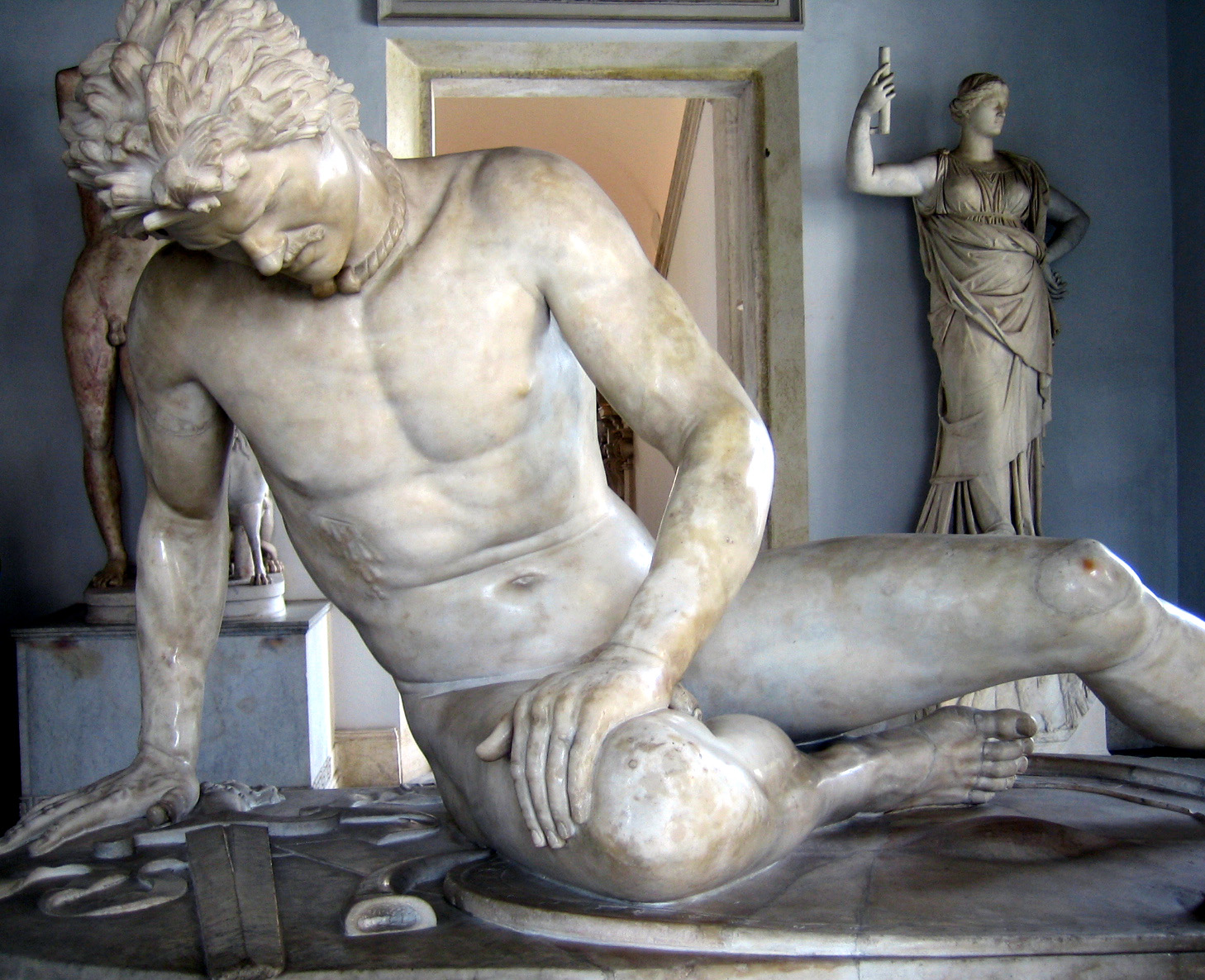
- Marble statue of the Dying Gaul which represented the defeat of the Gaulish tribes in Anatolia.
Date	Some point between 241–235 BC?
Location	Near the source of the Caecus River (modern-day Turkey)
Result	Pergamene victory

Belligerents
Kingdom of Pergamon	Galatian Tribes

Commanders and leaders
Attalus I	Unknown

The Battle of the Caecus River or Battle of the Kaikos was a battle between an army of the Kingdom of Pergamon commanded by Attalus I, and the Galatian tribes who resided in Anatolia (Asia Minor). The battle took place near the source of the Caecus River (Ancient Greek: Κάϊκος, romanized: Káïkos) and resulted in a victory for the Kingdom of Pergamon.

The exact date of the battle is unknown, but it seems to have taken place early in the reign of Attalus I. Attalus I celebrated it as a great victory and as establishing his legitimacy as ruler early in his reign, and used it as a reason to dub himself Soter, Savior, and to take the title of basileus, king. R. E. Allen suggests the early 230s (238 to 235 BC) as the best guess of the date.

== Context ==
During the 3rd century BC, there was a large migration of Gauls towards Anatolia. After passing through Greece, they arrived in Asia Minor, where they survived by raiding the towns along the Mediterranean coast. Many of these towns fell under the protection or direct control of the Kingdom of Pergamon, whose king, Eumenes I, agreed to pay the Gauls tribute in return for protection from their raids.

This situation changed with the ascendancy of Attalus I (believed to be the second cousin or the grandnephew of Eumenes I) in the year 241 BC. Attalus I decided against continuing the payment of tribute to the Gauls. Attalus I was the first Pergamene ruler who dared to go against this precedent. The stoppage of payment led to a military mobilization by both the Pergamenes and the Galatians, eventually leading to war between the two parties. Attalus I's reign began in 241 BC, giving the earliest possible date for this battle to have occurred.

== Battle ==
There are few surviving references that detail the course of this battle. What is known is that the outcome resulted in a decisive victory for Attalus I and Pergamon.

== Consequences ==
After the victory at the Caecus River, Attalus I adopted the surname Soter (lit. 'Savior') and officially received the title of King of Pergamon (basileus). The victory brought Attalus I fame, and he constructed monuments to his victory that were found by archaeologists centuries later. Even much later in his life, when he sent statues to Athens, he commissioned himself represented as in this battle.

One piece of interest was written by Pausanias. He recorded what was purportedly a prophecy of the sibyl Phaennis, written a generation before the battle, that predicted the battle and states as follows:

Then verily, having crossed the narrow strait of the Hellespont,
The devastating host of the Gauls shall pipe; and lawlessly
They shall ravage Asia; and much worse shall God do
To those who dwell by the shores of the sea
For a short while. For right soon the son of Cronos
Shall raise a helper, the dear son of a bull reared by Zeus
Who on all the Gauls shall bring a day of destruction.

According to Pausanias, the "son of the bull", the "one with bull horns" is a poetic reference to Attalus I.

To popularize the victory, Attalus funded the creation of artwork celebrating it. Among others, a monument was erected at the acropolis of Pergamon that included the famous sculptures the Dying Gaul and the Ludovisi Gaul.

After the defeat, the Galatians continued to be a serious threat to the states of Asia Minor. The Pergamenes and Galatians would fight again at the Battle of Aphrodisium. In fact, the Galatians continued to be a threat even after their defeat by the Romans under Gnaeus Manlius Vulso in the Galatian War fought in 189 BC. From this point until the region's annexation by the Roman Republic, they were virtually ignored as they had no access to the sea.

== See also ==
- Galatia
- Hellenistic period
