= Battle of Aphrodisium =

Battle, c.238 BC

Date	c. 238 BC
Location	Aphrodisium (modern-day Turkey)
Result	Pergamese victory

Belligerents
Pergamon	Seleucids Galatians

Commanders and leaders
Attalus	Antiochus Hierax

Strength
Unknown	Unknown

Casualties and losses
Unknown	Unknown

The Battle of Aphrodisium was fought circa 238 BC between the Kingdom of Pergamon of Attalus I and Seleucid forces led by Antiochus Hierax, allied with the Galatian Gauls. Attalus was victorious.

In 241 BC Attalus had won a great victory against the Galatians, who were migrating into Anatolia from Thrace. Several years after this defeat the Galatians wished to retaliate against Attalus and so allied themselves with Antiochus Hierax, who was the Seleucid ruler of much of Asia Minor and also wished to expand his influence. The allies invaded Pergamon but were defeated at Aphrodisium by Attalus.

Attalus would continue his war with Antiochus, winning many more victories. After a victory at the Battle of the Harpasus, Attalus would take control of nearly all of Seleucid Asia Minor, which he would hold until 221 BC.
