= Monument of the Eponymous Heroes =

Monument in ancient Athens

- Μνημείο των Επωνύμων Ηρώων
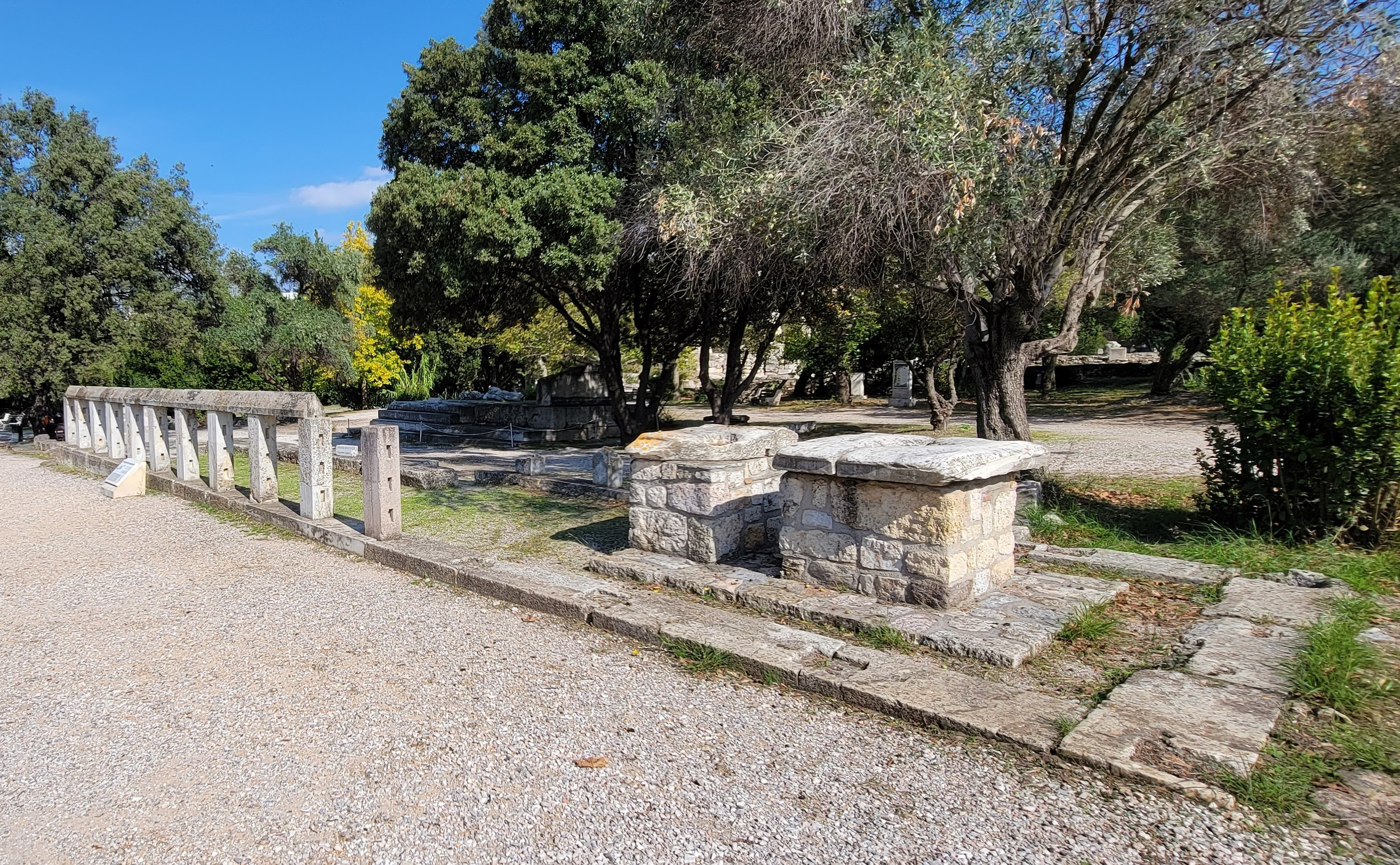
- Monument in 2021 (view from the southwest)
- Interactive map of Monument of the Eponymous Heroes
- Coordinates: 37°58′30.2″N 23°43′20.5″E
- Length: more than 16 m
- Dedicated to: Eponymous Heroes

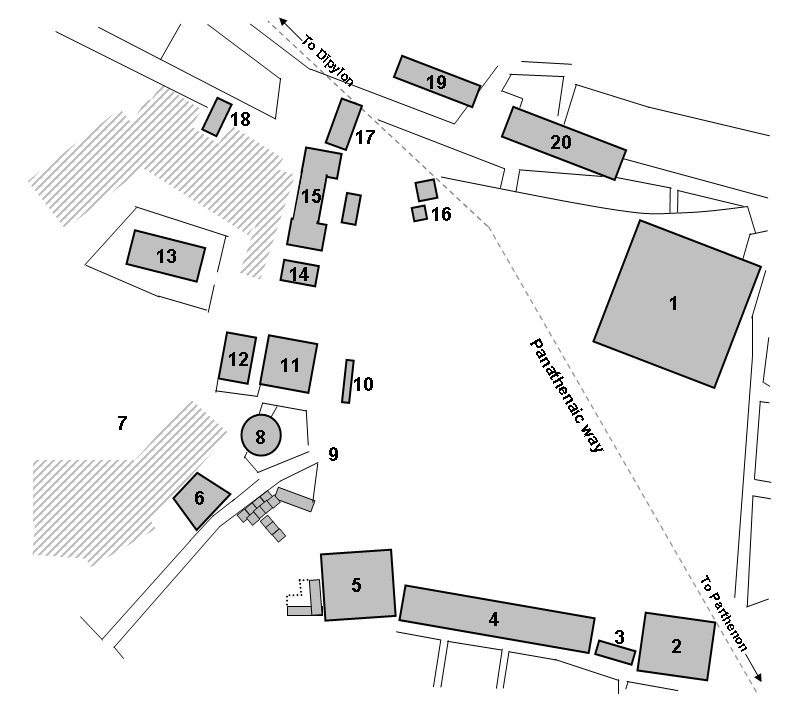
Plan showing major buildings and structures of the Ancient Agora of Classical Athens, c. 5th century BC, with the Monument of the Eponymous Heroes labeled 10

The Monument of the Eponymous Heroes (Greek: Μνημείο των Επωνύμων Ηρώων, romanized: Mnēmeio tōn Epōnymōn Hērōōn, located in the Ancient Agora of Athens, Greece adjacent to the Metroon (old Bouleuterion), was a marble podium that bore the bronze statues of the heroes representing the phylai (tribes) of Athens. The monument was surrounded by a wooden fence on stone posts. All that remains on the modern agora are pieces of a long (over 16 m (52 ft)) statue base with the space for ten statues and two tripods at the ends with a partially restored fence. The large size and prominent position make the monument into a landmark for the Agora visitors.

== Bulletin board ==
Being an important information center for the ancient Athenians, the place was used as an ancient bulletin board where proposed legislation, decrees, and announcements were posted on wooden tablets.

== Evolution ==
The remaining base is from the mid-4th century BC. The earliest known mention of the monument is almost a century older: Aristophanes in 424 BC refers to it as "place where lawsuits are displayed". No remains of an earlier monument were found at the current spot. A smaller, 9.7 m (32 ft) long, base was located about 50 m (55 yd) to the south under the Middle Stoa. While it can be argued that this was the site of the earlier monument, the identification is uncertain.

Cleisthenes had set up a new system of ten (instead of four) phylai around 508–507 B.C. (see Deme). The version of the monument of mid-4th century BC (so-called Period I) therefore included ten statues, one for each hero designating a phyle.

The late 4th century BC saw two statues added, representing Macedonian kings Antigonus I and Demetrius I Poliorcetes (two new tribes were added at this so-called Period II). Ptolemy III was added to the group some 80 years later (Period III). The Period II addition was reversed after the next 20 years, when Philip V of Macedon besieged Athens during the Second Macedonian War, followed by adding a sculpture of Attalos I (Period IV). Finally, in the 2nd century A.D., a statue of Hadrian was installed (Period V).

== Identification ==
The archeologists unearthed the unusual structure during the excavation of 1931; this was one of the first major finds. While not immediately identified (for tens of years the researchers referred to it as "Periphragma" or "Fenced Peribolos", the original report simply stated that this was not the Stoa of the Herms), the importance of the monument was clear due to its large size (the length of the fenced area was over 21 m (23 yd) long at the maximum, apparently during Period V), location next to Bouleuterion, and openness to the center of the Agora.

It appears that there was no quick breakthrough in the monument identification. Instead, as the archeologists understood the layout of agora better and better, the fact that "peribolos" represent the ruins of the Monument of the Eponymous Heroes became "increasingly clear". Several post-Second World War excavation maps routinely marked the location as such since at least 1947. T. Leslie Shear, Jr. attributes the first detailed explanation of the identification to the 1949 article by Eugene Vanderpool, where the author, among other considerations, had dealt with the remark by Pausanias that the monument was located above the Tholos (No. 8 on the map). This remark, if interpreted literally, would have placed the Eponymous Heroes out of the main area of the agora. Vanderpool suggested to read Ancient Greek: άνωτέρω (anōterō), 'above' as Ancient Greek: άπωτέρω (apōterō), 'further away'. Vanderpool also explains the words of an unknown commenter of Aristophanes' Peace that the monument was close to Prytaneion (Pausanias places the latter on the northern slope of the Acropolis). Vanderpool agreed with earlier commenters that there was a confusion between Prytaneion and Prytanikon, a section of Tholos.

== Exploration ==
The monument was the first major discovery of the first archeological season in 1931, with a detailed study of the foundation of the still unidentified structure published in 1933 by Richard Stillwell. Few pieces of stone posts and capping blocks were used to reconstruct the fence panels on the western side in 1951. An additional major probing of the fill in the area dates back to 1967.

== Description ==
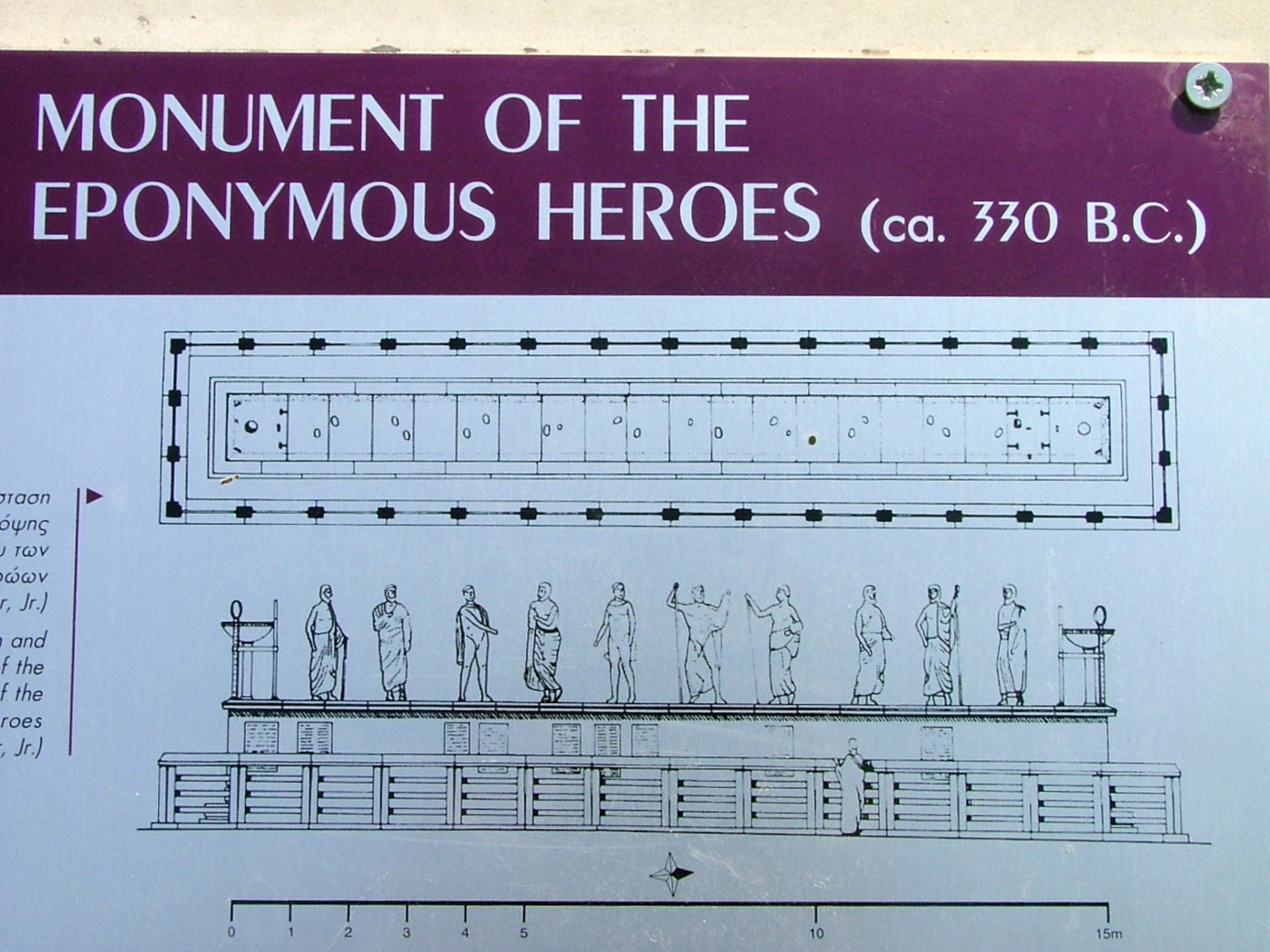
Reconstruction of the monument during the Period I

The monument was placed almost parallel to the porch of the Bouleuterion, on the east side a major road that formed the eastern boundary of the market area of the Agora. The sill of the peribolos, quite well preserved with only a few pieces missing, is a rectangle 18.40 m × 3.56 m (60.4 ft × 11.7 ft) in size formed by a course of narrow blocks made of hard light-gray poros stone. The overall construction exhibits a "surprising" lack of precision and regularity, with the peribolos being 12 cm (4.7 in) wider at the north end than at the south one. Only the north end of the sill has any semblance of a foundation, while the rest was placed onto a shallow layer of earth spread across the rough surface packed by the previous intensive traffic. No clamps are holding the sill blocks together, so the blocks have shifted exposing significant gaps (up to 5 cm (2.0 in)). The ground under the monument slopes down to the north, so the builders tried to set the blocks to compensate for the slope by exposing just 18 cm (7.1 in) of the sill blocks at the south end (as indicated by better dressing of the stone) versus 30 cm (12 in) at the north end. But the sill course is still 7 cm (2.8 in) lower at the north end.

Some of the periodic cutouts in the blocks contain remnants of the leaded-in marble fence posts.

Each sill block has cutouts at either end for a pair of metal dowels that were used in the original (Period I) design of the fence, with posts spaced at approximately 1.27 m at the north end and 1.02 m at the south end. (Fifteen posts on each long side, and four posts on each short side.) A single post through these dowels joined adjacent sill blocks; the builders considered other clamps unnecessary. The fence itself consisted of three wooden rails inserted into the slots on the posts.

Very little is left from the superstructure of the monument, though enough to permit a reconstruction:

- five blocks of euthynteria at the north end;
- traces of foundation, again at the north end;
- two small fragments of the marble steps of the crepidoma;
- two pedestal caps, one for the statue and one for the bronze tripod.

Periods II and III, with their additions of statues, required a redesign of the pedestal. According to the reconstruction, the builders tried to alter the fence as little as possible while extending the pedestal. They went so far as to eliminate the marble steps on the narrow ends of the crepidoma. Period IV saw a fairly haphazard repair of the peribolos. Gates were installed to provide the officials with access to the pedestal for posting the notices.

In Period V, the peribolos was extended to the south by approximately 2.75 m (9.0 ft), as evidenced by the surviving foundations. At the same time, the fence construction on the eastern (apparently, more important) side, previously made of poros stone, was replaced by one of Pentelic marble, taller, but of "rather poor quality." The new fence terminated against the faces of the orthostates at the ends of the pedestal.

== Heroes and phylai ==
After the Cleisthenes reform, each Athenian phyle was no longer an actual kinship group, but more of an administrative subdivision, symbolically designated by an eponymous "founder", originally a legendary hero, later an honorary figure. Ancient Athenian documents listed the phylai in a particular order; historians frequently use Roman numerals to designate them.

Order	Hero	Phyle	Hero's identity
I	Erechtheus	Erechtheis	Mythological king, founder of Athens
II	Aegeus	Aegeis	King of Athens, father of Theseus
III	Pandion	Pandionis	One of the two legendary kings of Athens, Pandion I or Pandion II
IV	Leos	Leontis	Son of Orpheus
V	Acamas	Acamantis	Son of Theseus
VI	Oeneus	Oineis	Calydonian king
VII	Cecrops	Kekropis	King of Athens
VIII	Hippothoon	Hippothontis	Mythical king of Eleusis
IX	Aias	Aiantis	Mythological hero that fought in Trojan War
X	Antiochus	Antiochis	Son of Heracles
XI	Antigonus	Antigonis	One of the Diadochi, father of Demetrius
XII	Demetrius	Demetrias	King of Macedonia
XIII	Ptolemy	Ptolemais	King of Egypt
XIV	Attalus	Attalis	King of Pergamon
XV	Hadrian	Adrianis	Roman emperor

== Sources ==
- Shear, T. Leslie Jr. (1970). "The Monument of the Eponymous Heroes in the Athenian Agora" (PDF). Hesperia. 39 (3): 145–222. doi:10.2307/147592. JSTOR 147592.
- Mattusch, C.C. (1996). Classical Bronzes: The Art and Craft of Greek and Roman Statuary. Cornell University Press. ISBN 978-0-8014-3182-1.
- Seyffert, O.; Nettleship, H.; Sandys, J.E. (1895). "Phyle". A Dictionary of Classical Antiquities: Mythology, Religion, Literature & Art. W. Glaisher, Limited. pp. 487–488.
- Gmirkin, R.E. (2016). "Athenian and Pentateuchal Legal Institutions". Plato and the Creation of the Hebrew Bible. Taylor & Francis. ISBN 978-1-134-85458-5.
- Glowacki, Kevin (2021-08-13). "The Athenian Agora". Meet the Philosophers of Ancient Greece. London: Routledge. pp. 257–259. doi:10.4324/9781315249223-65. ISBN 978-1-315-24922-3. S2CID 238682945.
- Vanderpool, Eugene (1949). "The Route of Pausanias in the Athenian Agora". Hesperia. 18 (1). American School of Classical Studies at Athens (ASCSA): 128–137. doi:10.2307/147000. ISSN 0018-098X. JSTOR 147000.
- Camp, John McK. (2010-02-28). "Monument of the Eponymous Heroes". The Athenian Agora: Site Guide (5th ed.). American School of Classical Studies at Athens. pp. 66–68. doi:10.2972/j.ctv13nb7c4. ISBN 978-1-62139-016-9.
