= 229 BC =

229 BC in various calendars
Gregorian calendar	229 BC; CCXXIX BC
Ab urbe condita	525
Ancient Egypt era	XXXIII dynasty, 95
Pharaoh	Ptolemy III Euergetes, 18
Ancient Greek Olympiad (summer)	137th Olympiad, year 4
Assyrian calendar	4522
Balinese saka calendar	N/A
Bengali calendar	−822 – −821
Berber calendar	722
Buddhist calendar	316
Burmese calendar	−866
Byzantine calendar	5280–5281
Chinese calendar	辛未年 (Metal Goat); 2469 or 2262 — to — 壬申年 (Water Monkey); 2470 or 2263
Coptic calendar	−512 – −511
Discordian calendar	938
Ethiopian calendar	−236 – −235
Hebrew calendar	3532–3533
- Hindu calendars
Vikram Samvat	−172 – −171
Shaka Samvat	N/A
Kali Yuga	2872–2873
Holocene calendar	9772
Iranian calendar	850 BP – 849 BP
Islamic calendar	876 BH – 875 BH
Javanese calendar	N/A
Julian calendar	N/A
Korean calendar	2105
Minguo calendar	2140 before ROC 民前2140年
Nanakshahi calendar	−1696
Seleucid era	83/84 AG
Thai solar calendar	314–315
Tibetan calendar	阴金羊年 (female Iron-Goat) −102 or −483 or −1255 — to — 阳水猴年 (male Water-Monkey) −101 or −482 or −1254

Year 229 BC was a year of the pre-Julian Roman calendar. At the time it was known as the Year of the Consulship of Albinus and Centumalus (or, less frequently, year 525 Ab urbe condita). The denomination 229 BC for this year has been used since the early medieval period when the Anno Domini calendar era became the prevalent method in Europe for naming years.

== Events ==
=== By place ===
==== Anatolia ====
- Attalus I of Pergamon wins the Battle of the Harpasus in western Anatolia.

==== Illyria ====
- The First Illyrian War started when the Roman Senate dispatched an army under the command of the consuls Lucius Postumius Albinus and Gnaeus Fulvius Centumalus to Illyria. Rome forced the withdrawal of Illyrian garrisons in the Greek cities of Epidamnus, Apollonia, Corcyra and Pharos and establishes a protectorate over these Greek towns.
- The Illyrian tribe of the Ardiaei is subdued by the Romans.
- The King of Macedonia, Demetrius II, dies. His nephew, Antigonus III comes to the Macedonian throne as regent for his half-cousin and the future king Philip V, who is only ten years old.
- Concerned at Rome's expansion, Antigonus III pursues a policy of befriending the Illyrians, even though the Greeks in the region support Rome in quelling the Illyrian pirates.
- The involvement of Rome in Illyria led to the establishment of friendly relations between Rome and the enemies of Macedonia: the Aetolian League and Achaean League, which approve the suppression of Illyrian piracy.
- Aratus of Sicyon brings Argos into the Achaean League and then helps liberate Athens. This brings Aratus into conflict with Sparta.

==== China ====
- The Qin general Wang Jian launches a three-pronged invasion of the state of Zhao but is hindered by the Zhao general Li Mu.
- The Zhao Prime Minister Guo Kai, influenced by the machinations of Qin, executes Li Mu.

== Births ==
- Lucius Aemilius Paullus Macedonicus, Roman consul and general (d. 160 BC)
- Qin Er Shi, Chinese emperor of the Qin Dynasty (d. 207 BC)
- Titus Quinctius Flaminius, Roman consul and general (d. 174 BC)

== Deaths ==
- Demetrius II, Macedonian king from 239 BC (b. c. 276 BC)
- Li Mu, Chinese general of the Zhao State (Warring States Period)
- Margos of Keryneia, Greek general of the Achaean League
