= Temple of Apollonis =

Temple in Cyzicus, Turkey

The Temple of Apollonis was built at Cyzicus in modern Turkey in the 2nd century BC, in order to honor Apollonis of Cyzicus. The Cyzicene epigrams were inscribed in this temple.

== Location ==
Located on the southern Propontis coast of modern-day northwest Turkey, Cyzicus was an important port for the rulers of Pergamon, and friendship was maintained since the beginning of the Attalid dynasty. Founded in the 8th century B.C.E. and retaining its independence throughout the Hellenistic period, it grew to be a center of trade connecting Europe and Asia, comparable in power to the later Byzantium Empire. The city was also a renowned center for education in various fields, with its location allowing for a vast cultural network.

== Influence of Apollonis at Cyzicus ==
With Cyzicus as a major trading hub and potential naval power, the marriage of Apollonis created a strong alliance between her hometown and Pergamon and engendered a stronger form of loyalty by the citizens of Cyzicus through their identification with one of their own. She also imported various aspects of Cyzicus to Pergamon, including iconography styles and political allies, creating a symbiotic exchange of material and cultural trade. Her prestige as an heir-bearing queen would further establish a sense of pride in her hometown, as evidenced by the construction of a temple after her death in which the focus was parent-child mythology. This favourable image of Apollonis by the polis was maintained through royal visits with her sons, to the point they would be invoked in the reliefs of her temple. Her popularity was strong enough that her sons used her name to lay claim to their “origin” at Cyzicus, despite having been born elsewhere, with later generations maintaining the friendship-alliance. She received a dedicated temple, likely near the harbour.

== Temple ==
Following her death and deification in the mid-second century B.C.E., a temple to Apollonis was built at Cyzicus. It's debated whether the construction was organised by her sons or the polis of Cyzicus; if it was indeed built by her sons, it takes on a characteristically complex motivation. It was allegedly known by simple reference for several centuries afterwards, though its location is lost today. The inclusion of mythology along the theme of child-parent and brotherly love in reliefs at the temple fixed the image of Apollonis and her sons in the collective memory of the Cyzicenes, and throughout the kingdom of Pergamon by way of visitors to the city.

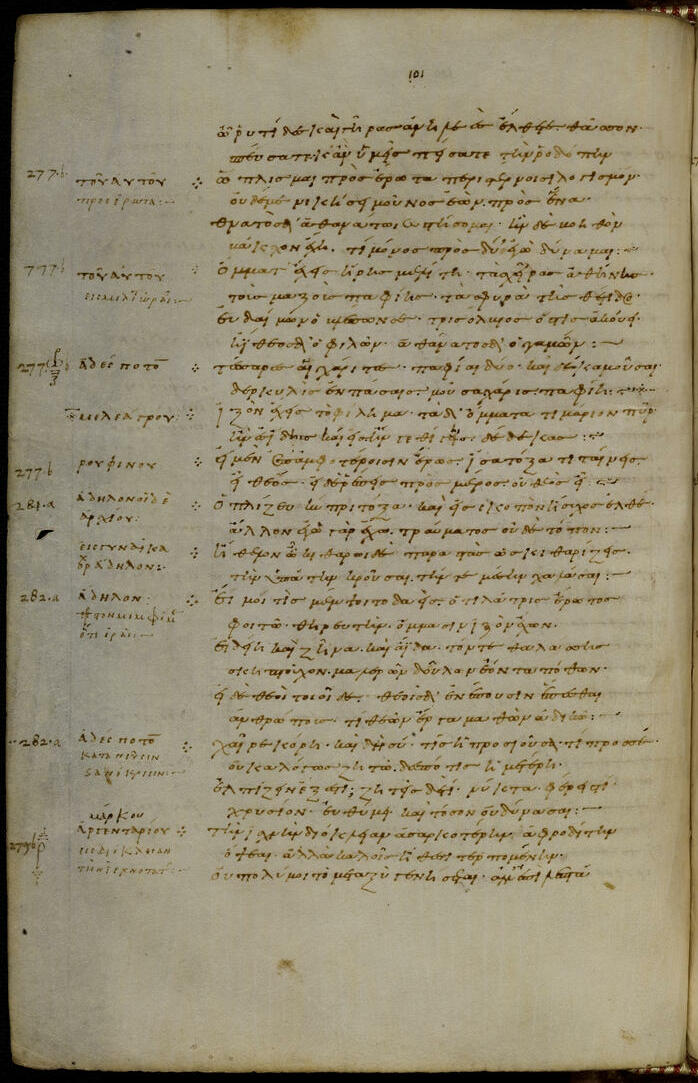
Page from the Palatine Anthology from the Library of the University of Heidelberg

=== Lack of archaeological evidence ===
There is no record or decree dedicated to the creation of a temple at Cyzicus to Apollonis. The only evidence of its existence comes from the Palatine Anthology. The book is based on a series of stone epigrams, since lost. No systematic excavations have been done at Cyzicus, much less specifically in search of her temple. The lack of literary or archaeological parallels thus make it difficult to authenticate the limited existing information regarding its existence.

== Epigrams of Cyzicus ==
The epigrams are preserved in transcription form in the third book of the Palatine Anthology, compiled in the 10th century AD and later absorbed into the larger Greek Anthology It includes an introduction followed by 19 sequentially numbered epigrams describing the reliefs displayed in the temple, commentary in the margins. The reliefs depict various scenes from Greek mythology connected by a common theme of parent-child devotion and cooperation, oftentimes with two brothers.

The introductory lemma dates the collection to the second century B.C.E, but analysis of the textual style of the epigrams argues that their origin is post-Hellenistic. The textual lemmas (as opposed to the marginal ones) are proposed to have an earlier source than the epigrams, if not a direct source at the temple, as they include autonomous knowledge of the reliefs. The epigrams are hypothesized to be a stylistic experiment by a viewer of the reliefs and when they do offer new details, they do so to emphasize the pathos of the filial piety and its moral and political significance, as well as to display the author's knowledge of ancient culture.

=== Introductory Lemma ===
ἐπιγράμματα ἐν τῷ Κυζίκῳ εἰς τὸν ναὸν Ἀπολλωνίδος, τῆς μητρὸς Ἀττάλου καὶ Εὐμένους, Ἐπιγράμματα, ἃ εἰς τὰ στυλοπινάκιον ἐγέγραπτο, περιέχοντα ἀναγλύφους ἱστορίας, ὡς ὑποτέτακται.

Demoen translation: “The epigrams that were inscribed on the stylopinakia in the temple of Apollonis, mother of Attalus and Eumenes at Cyzicus, and that contain stories that were wrought in low relief : they are written below.”

Paton's translation: “In the temple at Cyzicus of Apollonis, the mother of Attalus and Eumenes, inscribed on the tablets of the columns, which contained scenes in relief, as follows : ”

2020 Oxford translation: “At Cyzicus, inside the Temple of Apollonis, mother of Attalus and Eumenes: epigrams which were inscribed on the tablets set into the columns. These tablets contained narrative scenes, carved in low relief, as is set out below.”

The first lemma, the only one deliberately unaccompanied by a poetic epigram, offers important details about the temple (at the cost of confusion over the grammar). It attests to the existence of a temple dedicated to Apollonis at Cyzicus and reinforces her connection to her well-known royal sons; such a fact attests to her lasting fame and importance in the region (however, it does not state her sons built the temple, as is assumed by many scholars). It also states that a series of images based on various myths were carved in relief and displayed there. Finally, it describes some of the architecture in the mention of stylopinakia (στυλοπινάκιον); however, this term is unique to this text and its exact definition and appearance is subject to debate, although it is largely agreed upon to be a pillar or column with some sort of carved display.

=== The Nineteen Epigrams ===
For the full text, see volume 1 of the Greek Anthology translated by W.R.Paton

== Iconography ==
The reliefs at the temple were “ephemeral” carvings, likely bas-relief, as is seen in the style of other reliefs at Cyzicus at the time. The location of the reliefs themselves within the temple are argued to either be between each pillar or directly on them, whether permanent or detachable.

The subject matter ranges from widely-known to obscure, with all depicting mythology sourced from various places in the Hellenistic Greek world, establishing a pan-Mediterranean connection. Each image is related to the theme of filial piety and brotherly cooperation, ranging from violent to peaceful in seemingly random order. The violence described in some of the scenes would require dramatic and dynamic renderings to remain accurate to the descriptions.

The reasoning behind the myths chosen are the subject of debate; some argue that the rarity or disparity of connection between some of the stories and the Attalids or Apollonis herself reflects poorly on the themes of motherhood and brotherhood, but this ignores the fact that it is unknown which would have been popular in Cyzicus specifically, or the political implications of including certain mythical figures. It is likely if the reliefs were truly as described, the variants chosen were due to the careful deliberation of scholars or religious officials close to the Attalids, and with knowledge of the cultural network of visitors to Cyzicus. Certain epigrams also allude directly to stories associated with Apollonis in life and/or famous Pergamon monuments to mothers.

== Architecture, location, and other spatial information ==
With the lack of archaeological verification, the structure and verbiage of the collection of epigrams offer the only insight into the layout of the temple. This introduces the problem of emission; details difficult to incorporate may be the fault of the source leaving out design aspects they thought irrelevant (ex. extra columns that had no associated reliefs or decorations unrelated to the theme of filial piety).

The lemmata offer precise indications of the cardinal directions (as well as a sense of movement through specific diction choices), with the front of the temple agreed upon by most scholars to be facing south.

The stylopinaka are known to be arranged in a continuous sequence along the peristyle, with one per epigram, but the uneven number listed complicates renderings of their placement (see figs. 6-8). Controversy is further invoked in defining the appearance of the stylopinakia themselves, due to the translation difficulties; the main debate is whether the reliefs were inscribed onto the pillars themselves, on the walls between, or on a separate tablet that was then attached to the pillar.

An additional difficulty is determining the material of the columns and the reliefs. Whilst the reliefs are agreed to be carved in bas-relief, the word used can refer to stone, marble, clay or even metal through embossing or chiseling.
