= Esther V. Hansen =

American classical scholar (1898–1986)

- Born: Esther Violet Hansen; August 23, 1898; Omaha, Nebraska, U.S.
- Died: February 23, 1986 (aged 87); Horseheads, New York, U.S.
- Occupation: Classical scholar

Academic background
- Education: Vassar College; University of Wisconsin; Cornell University
- Thesis: Attalus I of Pergamum (1930)
- Doctoral advisor: Eugene Plumb Andrews

Academic work
- Discipline: Ancient Greek history
- Sub-discipline: Kingdom of Pergamon
- Institutions: Wells College; Elmira College

Esther Violet Hansen (August 23, 1898 – February 23, 1986) was an American classical scholar who specialized in the Kingdom of Pergamon, a Hellenistic-era monarchy in western Asia Minor. A Guggenheim Fellow, she worked at Elmira College as a professor in classics for almost three decades (1934–1963).

== Biography ==
Esther Violet Hansen, the daughter of Larlane (nee Knudsen) and Peter Hansen, was born on August 23, 1898 in Omaha, Nebraska. After studying at Vassar College (where she got an AB in 1921) and the University of Wisconsin (where she got an MA in 1922, her thesis being titled The minor poems of Vergil), she started working at a college-preparatory school in Cincinnati as a teacher of Latin in 1923. In 1924, she moved to Wells College (Note: T. Corey Brennan theorizes that this decision may have motivated by the death of Moses Slaughter, a Latinist who had served as the advisor of her Master of Arts thesis back at Wisconsin.) and worked as a classics professor there until 1930. (Note: Sources differ on what positions Hansen held in Wells College. The John Simon Guggenheim Memorial Foundation says that she started out as an instructor in classics before being promoted to assistant professor in 1928. The Database of Classical Scholars, however, says that she was an assistant professor during her entire tenure.)

Having worked on it while working at Wells, she received her PhD from Cornell University in 1930, with her dissertation Attalus I of Pergamum being advised by future long-time friend Eugene Plumb Andrews. She was an American Academy in Rome fellow (1930–1931) and an American Council of Learned Societies fellow (1931–1932). In 1934, she started working at Elmira College as an assistant professor in Classics, and she was later promoted to Associate Professor in 1939 and eventually Professor in 1940. From 1954 to 1956, she was president of Elmira's Phi Beta Kappa chapter. In 1963, her career at Elmira College ended.

As an academic, she specialized in the Kingdom of Pergamon. In 1943, she was appointed as a Guggenheim Fellow for a project on the city of Pergamon during the Attalid dynasty era. Her 1947 book The Attalids of Pergamum was described by T. Corey Brennan as "the first truly comprehensive study of [the Kingdom of Pergamon] and [one that] remains an essential study".

Hansen died in Horseheads, New York, on February 23, 1986. Her body was later returned to her native Omaha, where her funeral was held.

== Publications ==
- The Attalids of Pergamum (1947)
