= Philetaerus =

Governor and autonomous ruler of Pergamon

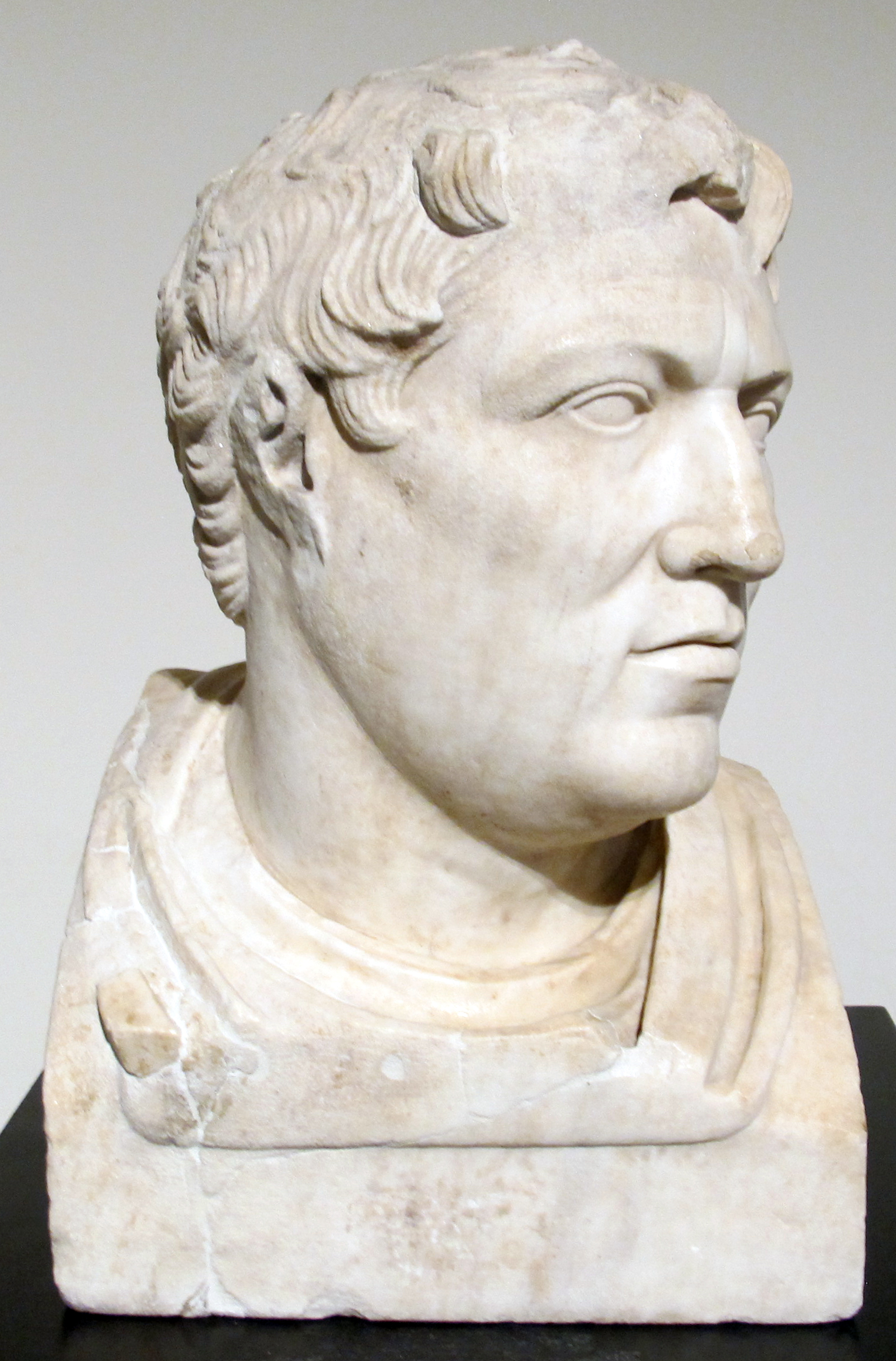
- Marble bust of Philetaerus. Roman copy from 1st century AD of the Greek original. Naples National Archaeological Museum.

King of Pergamon
- Reign: 282–263 BC
- Predecessor: part of Lysimachus kingdom
- Successor: Eumenes I
- Born: c. 343 BC; Tieium (modern-day Filyos, Zonguldak, Turkey)
- Died: 263 BC
- Greek: Φιλέταιρος
- Dynasty: Attalid dynasty
- Father: Attalus
- Mother: Boa
- Religion: Greek polytheism

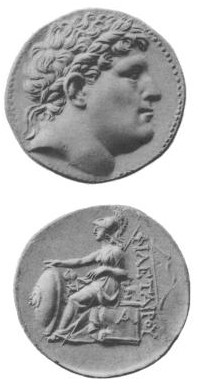
Coin, depicting the head of Philetaerus on the obverse and seated Athena, Greek goddess of war and wisdom, on the reverse, struck during the reign of Eumenes I (263 BC–241 BC)

Philetaerus (/ˌfɪlɪˈtiːrəs/; Ancient Greek: Φιλέταιρος, Philétairos, c. 343 – 263 BC) was the founder of the Attalid dynasty of Pergamon in Anatolia.

== Early life and career under Lysimachus ==
Philetaerus was born in Tieium (Greek: Tieion), a small town on the Black Sea coast in Anatolia. His father Attalus (Greek: Attalos) was Greek and his mother Boa was from Paphlagonia.

After the death of Alexander the Great in 323 BC, Philetaerus became involved in the Wars of the Diadochi among Alexander's regional governors, Antigonus in Phrygia, Lysimachus in Thrace, and Seleucus in Babylonia (among others). Philetaerus first served under Antigonus. He then shifted his allegiance to Lysimachus, who, after Antigonus was killed at the Battle of Ipsus in 301 BC, made Philetaerus commander of Pergamon, where Lysimachus kept a treasury of nine thousand talents of silver.

== Ruler of Pergamon ==
Philetaerus served Lysimachus until 282 BC, when, perhaps because of conflicts involving the court intrigues of Arsinoë, Lysimachus' third wife, Philetaerus deserted Lysimachus, offering himself and the important fortress of Pergamon, along with its treasury, to Seleucus, who subsequently defeated and killed Lysimachus at the Battle of Corupedium in 281 BC. Seleucus himself was killed by Ptolemy Ceraunus, a brother of Arsinoë at Lysimachia a few months later.

Though nominally under Seleucid control, Philetaerus, especially after the death of Seleucus, had considerable autonomy and was able with the help of his considerable wealth to increase his power and influence beyond Pergamon. There are numerous records of Philetaerus as benefactor to neighboring cities and temples, including the temples at Delphi and Delos. He also contributed troops, money and food to the city of Cyzicus for defense against the invading Gauls. As a result, Philetaerus gained prestige and goodwill for himself and his family.

During his nearly forty year rule, he constructed the temple of Demeter on the acropolis of Pergamon, and the temple of Athena (Pergamon's patron deity), and Pergamon's first palace, and he added considerably to the city's fortifications.

Philetaerus was a eunuch, though scholars differ on the reason for his castration. Attalus I, the first Attalid king of Pergamon, explained that when Philetaerus was a baby, he was brought into a crowd where he was pressed upon and his testicles were crushed.

"Philetaerus of Tieium, was a eunuch from boyhood; for it came to pass at a certain burial, when a spectacle was being given at which many people were present, that the nurse who was carrying Philetaerus, still an infant, was caught in the crowd and pressed so hard that the child was incapacitated. He was a eunuch, therefore, but he was well trained and proved worthy of this trust."

Philetaerus never married and, since he was a eunuch, had no children. He adopted his nephew Eumenes I (the son of Philetaerus' brother also named Eumenes), who succeeded him as ruler of Pergamon, upon his death in 263 BC. With the exception of Eumenes II, all future Attalid rulers depicted the bust of Philetaerus on their coins, paying tribute to the founder of their dynasty.

== Bibliography ==
- Hansen, Esther V. (1971). The Attalids of Pergamon. Ithaca, New York: Cornell University Press; London: Cornell University Press Ltd. ISBN 0-8014-0615-3.
- Kosmetatou, Elizabeth (2003) "The Attalids of Pergamon," in Andrew Erskine, ed., A Companion to the Hellenistic World. Oxford: Blackwell: pp. 159–174. ISBN 1-4051-3278-7. text
- Junianus Justinus, Epitome of the Philippic History of Pompeius Trogus, translated, with Footnotes, by the Rev. John Selby Watson; London: Henry G. Bohn, York Street, Convent Garden (1853).
- Pausanias, Description of Greece, Books I-II, (Loeb Classical Library) translated by W. H. S. Jones; Cambridge, Massachusetts: Harvard University Press; London, William Heinemann Ltd. (1918) ISBN 0-674-99104-4.
- Strabo, Geography, (Loeb Classical Library) translated by Horace Leonard Jones; Cambridge, Massachusetts: Harvard University Press; London: William Heinemann, Ltd. (1924) Books 10–12, ISBN 0-674-99233-4; Books 13–14, ISBN 0-674-99246-6.

Regnal titles
New title part of Lysimachus kingdom	Ruler of Pergamon; 282–263 BC	Succeeded by Eumenes I
