= Apollonis of Cyzicus =

Apollonis (Ancient Greek: Ἀπολλωνίς, romanized: Apollōnís) was the wife of Attalus I, the first ruler of Pergamon (now Bergama, Turkey). The dates of her birth and death are unclear; scholars estimate that she was born around 240 BCE., while estimating her death as any time between 175 and 159 BCE. Apollonis outlived her husband, who was approximately 30 years older than her, by many years.

Born in Cyzicus (an independent city-state) to an elite/rich but plebeian (demotes; δημότις) family, Apollonis married Attalus around 223 BCE. The lack of noble blood was likely not an area of contention, considering the Attalids’ own plebeian/commoner origins. She was given the title of basilissa (βασίλισσα) upon her marriage, recognizing her newfound status and reinforcing the prestige and legitimacy of the Attalid dynasty.

Apollonis gave birth to four sons (in order: Eumenes 222/1, Attalus, Philetairos and Athenaios). She was praised for this “exemplary” fertility and her motherhood was thereafter stressed as a fundamental part of her identity, as family virtues were for the whole of the Attalid dynasty. Upon the death of Attalus I in 197 BCE, she remained an influential part of the household in her widowhood, as she was the only woman of authority for many years and saw to her relatively-young sons’ education. The brothers were recognised as the sons of not only Attalus I, but Apollonis as well, in the letters, decrees, and inscriptions of allied cities throughout the kingdom, in a departure from the normal patriarchal Hellenistic tradition.

Her main project in life was the expansion of the Sanctuary of Demeter at Pergamon, which was likely made in honour of the birth of her sons and expanded upon the smaller original by Attalus’ ancestor, Philetairos through her own dowry funds. She immortalizes herself by including her name on the inscription on the entrance, a prominent place that all visitors would see, which reads: “Queen Apollonis dedicates these stoas and these structures as a thank-offering to Demeter and Kore Thesmophoros.” In financing a place where primarily large amounts of women would gather, she would create a strong sense of gratitude and loyalty towards herself.

== Political importance and agency ==
Apollonis was by no means a passive part of the ruling family. She maintained balance between a public and private household, often using her own reputation as a “perfect” mother to increase her power and importance, or used by others to increase their own by association (as was the case her husband, sons, and daughter-in-law). Indeed, her role as basilissa likely paralleled that of her husband, in that while the king was in charge of military endeavours, she offered a form of “peaceful” conquest through the establishment of a cultural identity and personal connection with the citizens that would engender stronger loyalty throughout the kingdom, through this “empathetic” image of a “queen-mother”. She made herself to be known as the ideal woman, in her devotion to family and religious piety, promoting a few key aspects to create an easily-transmitted-and-digested construct that would come to be known as “homonoia”. Rather than pushing boundaries of expected gender roles, she used the expectation to her advantage to create a political caricature and ensure a favourable lasting memory.

Her origin at Cyzicus would further connect various points of the kingdom, particularly through the reminder of her presence at Pergamon as a publicly emphasized figure. Rather than marrying into a noble family relatively removed from their citizens, her original middle-class status would reinforce the idea the Attalids were pushing that they epitomized the “traditional family values of the Greek polis,” whilst still presenting themselves as inheritors to great monarchies (i.e. the Ptolemies and Seleucids). The royal ideology thus centered around the commonality of the family and its importance to the citizenry, resulting in Apollonis as a key figure in this political presentation. As a result, she was commonly invoked as a symbolic avatar in diplomacy and propaganda, reinforcing the union between the royals and poleis through spectacle, to the point “the bonds of political loyalty promoted by them were essentially bonds of loyalty to a family”. This was done by making regular appearances in public, both alone and as an essential part of the royal family unit (rather than simply a concubine or one-of-many women vying for favouritism in a polygamic relationship), while also receiving public honours and named recognition from around the Hellenistic world. She also created a reputation for herself as a “benefactress”, particularly for her expansion of the Sanctuary of Demeter at Pergamon. Her importance would continue in the form of a pseudo-dynastic ruler cults, which gave additional ideological legitimacy and a charismatic memory whilst allowing for the involvement of the poleis in establishing expectations for loyalty. Ruler cults mimicked religious rituals with an expectation of help from the honoured individual. It was only upon their death that the Attalids would be declared “gods” (theos/thea), in a departure from other dynastic practices, often aligning themselves with a god or goddess favoured by the declarers.

== Achievements ==
=== Ancient praises ===
Ancient inscriptions and literary sources largely praise Apollonis, although these sources sometimes come under doubt for a potentially artificial construct on the part of the Attalids and their allies. However, it is likely a certain extent was warranted; the praise for her piety is supported by her building project at the Sanctuary of Demeter, and even dynastically motivated propaganda wouldn't survive if there wasn't basic affection between her and her sons, especially if even basic affection was compared to other dynasties witnessed by the same authors. Most praise overlaps with her political identity related to motherhood and religious piety. She received several complementary epithets. Some prominent praises are as follows:

- Polybius’ The Histories (185 BCE) - 22.20.1-8
- Decree of Antiochus IV: Honours for king Eumenes II and his brothers (175 BCE) - OGIS 248
- Decree of Hierapolis (between 167 and 159 BCE) - OGIS 308
- Plutarch's Moralia (100 AD)

=== Unity of family ===
Her connection to family offered another avenue for her own political gain, in the form of influence over her husband and sons (and by extension, their policies, decisions, etc.) and the connections she had in Cyzicus.

=== Husband and sons ===
Although her status was considered “lesser” to her husband and she had no influence in politics stricto sensu, their marriage union provided a strong symbol for dynastic and personal propaganda. By departing from the polygamic problems of other dynasties, they strengthened the opinion of the dynasty as a whole via this portrayal of stability.

Her influence was arguably great over her sons. This is seen in her direct involvement with their education as youths and her presence as the only parent for a majority of their adult lives, cementing her domestic authority via these mother-child bonds. The political advantages of harmonious sons is seen in the lack of infighting and alleged trust amongst the brothers, which would then be praised by witnesses and contrasted with the violence of other dynasties.

=== Family at Cyzicus ===
Apollonis’ new court at Pergamon likely resulted in certain positions of power or honour to be given to her family from Cyzicus. She also imparts a piece of her paternal heritage in the naming of her sons; whilst the first three are named after the male ancestors of Attalus I, her youngest is named after her own father, a civic dignitary of Cyzicus. Such connections would further strengthen the bonds of kinship and friendship between the two cities, as her descendants put their own claim of inheritance on the area.

== Posthmous cult ==
By the Hellenistic period, ruler cults were a relatively well-established aspect of Greek culture, particularly in the introduction by the poleis or by a ruler in honour of a deceased family member. The rulers acted as an avatar, connecting “removed” deities with mortal worshippers and “answering” their prayers via means awarded to them by their own elevated rank. This legitimized a central government via the local traditions and civic memory, working as an ancient form of diplomacy.

Apollonis was deified and celebrated by cults throughout Asia Minor, this status legitimized by the existence of temples or shrines dedicated to her, alongside a dedicated cultic priest and annual celebration, including ritualistic sacrifices and public processions, likely in association with a popular fertility goddesses, such as Aphrodite and Demeter. Hers is a unique situation: it is impossible to tell if her cults are “spontaneous” and unrelated civic cults, or if it was a deliberate attempt on behalf of her sons to establish a kingdom-wide dynastic cult in the name of “spreading the monarchic ideology and gaining the loyalty of subjects far from the centers of power,” in preparation of their own rule and subsequent death cult. This is further complicated by the Attalids’ practice of “limited divine honours” in life and deification only after death, to contrast the practice of the Ptolemies and the Seleucids.

She received honours, consolatory decrees to her surviving family, and deification in various cities throughout the Pergamene kingdom and their allies in Rome and Athens. Notable examples of her cult are located at Teos and Cyzicus. The existence of a cult at Pergamon itself, where her body was entombed by her sons in the Great Temple of Hera, continues to be debated.

=== Cult at Teos ===
Relations between the Attalids and Teos often fluctuated, but became relatively stable by the time Apollonis’ cult was established there. The city decreed divine honours and established an altar “in the most conspicuous place,” dedicated to thea Apollonis eusebes apobateria (θεὰ Ἀπολλωνίς εὐσεβής ἀποβατήρια). She was declared a divine patroness of motherhood, marriage, and education. The decree is fairly detailed and gives insight into the honours she may have received at other cities. This included a joint priest between Aphrodite and Apollonis, a joint priestess between the goddess Apollonis and the living-queen Stratonice, and an annual festival which involved a chorus of young boys and dance performance by young girls, as well as a sacrifice on her altar

Apollonis was strongly allied with Aphrodite at Teos, known as her synnaos (σύνναος), through their joint association with motherhood.

For the full text, see: Epigraph at Teos (between 166 and 159 BCE) - OGIS 309; Teos 45

=== Cult at Cyzicus ===
Details about the actual cult practices for Apollonis at Cyzicus are less extensive than at Teos, despite the construction of an actual temple devoted solely to her (see Temple of Apollonis). Certain aspects about the Teos cult or her in-life projects likely had parallels in her worship at Cyzicus, particularly in her association with Aphrodite or Demeter, the epithets she received, and the religious celebrations.
