= Heinz Heinen =

German-Belgian historian (1941–2013)

Heinz Heinen (September 14, 1941 – June 21, 2013) was a German-Belgian historian of classical antiquity. He was a professor of ancient history at the University of Trier from 1971 to 2006. Heinen's main research areas were Hellenistic Egypt and Roman Egypt, Augusta Treverorum in the Roman era (the predecessor to modern Trier), Crimea in the Roman era and the wider northern Black Sea region, Soviet and Russian historiography and views of antiquity, and slavery in antiquity (and in ancient Rome).

== Biography ==
Heinz Heinen was born in Sankt Vith on September 14, 1941. At the time, it was part of Nazi Germany, as the largely German-speaking Eupen-Malmedy region of Belgium was annexed by Germany during the occupation of Belgium, although the region was returned to Belgium in 1945 after Germany's defeat. He grew up in Sankt Vith, but moved to Leuven in 1959, where he studied ancient history and classical philology at the Katholieke Universiteit Leuven (Catholic University of Leuven). The German Academic Exchange Service arranged a scholarship for Heinen to study at the University of Tübingen from 1964 until 1965, where he was a research assistant to Karl Friedrich Stroheker. In 1966, Heinen completed a doctorate project under the historian Hermann Bengtson, Rom und Ägypten von 51 bis 47 v. Chr. ("Rome and Egypt from 51 to 47 BC"). His studies complete, he returned to Belgium to complete his mandatory year of military service in the Belgian Armed Forces in 1966–1967. He worked at LMU Munich from 1968 to 1970, where he completed a habilitation. He received an adjunct professorship position at the Saarland University, where he worked from 1970 to 1971. In 1971, he attained a full professorship at the University of Trier, where he would teach and research ancient history the rest of his career. He became a full member of the Akademie der Wissenschaften und der Literatur in 1998. Heinen retired from his professorship in October 2006.

== Personal life ==
Heinen married Marie-Louise Walderoth in 1965; the two had a son in 1967.

He died on June 21, 2013, in Trier after a long period of illness.

== Selected works ==
Essay collections

- Vom hellenistischen Osten zum römischen Westen. Ausgewählte Schriften zur Alten Geschichte (= Historia Einzelschriften. Band 191). Edited by Andrea Binsfeld and Stefan Pfeiffer. Franz Steiner, Stuttgart 2006, ISBN 3-515-08740-0.
- Kleopatra-Studien. Gesammelte Schriften zur ausgehenden Ptolemäerzeit (= Xenia. Konstanzer Althistorische Vorträge und Forschungen. Heft 49). Universitätsverlag Konstanz, Konstanz 2009, ISBN 978-3-87940-818-4.

Monographs

- Rom und Ägypten von 51 bis 47 v. Chr. Untersuchungen zur Regierungszeit der 7. Kleopatra und des 13. Ptolemäers. Dissertation, Universität Tübingen 1967.
- Untersuchungen zur hellenistischen Geschichte des 3. Jahrhunderts v. Chr. Zur Geschichte der Zeit des Ptolemaios Keraunos und zum Chremonideischen Krieg (= Historia Einzelschriften. Heft 20). Franz Steiner, Wiesbaden 1972.
- Trier und das Trevererland in römischer Zeit (= 2000 Jahre Trier. Band 1). Spee-Verlag, Trier 1985, ISBN 3-87760-065-4. 2., revised edition 1988; 3rd edition 1993.
- Frühchristliches Trier. Von den Anfängen bis zur Völkerwanderung. Paulinus-Verlag, Trier 1996, ISBN 3-7902-0178-2.
- Geschichte des Hellenismus. Von Alexander bis Kleopatra (C. H. Beck Wissen). C. H. Beck, München 2003, ISBN 3-406-48009-8. 2.
- Antike am Rande der Steppe. Der nördliche Schwarzmeerraum als Forschungsaufgabe (= Akademie der Wissenschaften und der Literatur Mainz: Abhandlungen der Geistes- und Sozialwissenschaftlichen Klasse. Jahrgang 2006, Nummer 5). Franz Steiner, Stuttgart 2006, ISBN 978-3-515-08921-0.

Works as an editor

- Die Geschichte des Altertums im Spiegel der sowjetischen Forschung (= Erträge der Forschung. Band 146). Wissenschaftliche Buchgesellschaft, Darmstadt 1980, ISBN 3-534-07314-2.
- Althistorische Studien. Hermann Bengtson zum 70. Geburtstag dargebracht von Kollegen und Schülern (= Historia Einzelschriften. Heft 40). Franz Steiner, Wiesbaden 1983, ISBN 3-515-03230-4.
- mit Hans Hubert Anton, Winfried Weber: Im Umbruch der Kulturen. Spätantike und Frühmittelalter. (= Geschichte des Bistums Trier. Band 1). Paulinus-Verlag, Trier 2003, ISBN 3-7902-0271-1.
- Menschenraub, Menschenhandel und Sklaverei in antiker und moderner Perspektive. Ergebnisse des Mitarbeitertreffens des Akademievorhabens "Forschungen zur antiken Sklaverei" (Mainz, 10. Oktober 2006) (= Forschungen zur antiken Sklaverei. Band 37). Franz Steiner, Stuttgart 2008, ISBN 978-3-515-09077-3.
- Antike Sklaverei – Rückblick und Ausblick. Neue Beiträge zur Forschungsgeschichte und zur Erschließung der archäologischen Zeugnisse (= Forschungen zur antiken Sklaverei. Band 38). Franz Steiner, Stuttgart 2010, ISBN 978-3-515-09413-9.
- Kindersklaven – Sklavenkinder. Schicksale zwischen Zuneigung und Ausbeutung in der Antike und im interkulturellen Vergleich. Beiträge zur Tagung des Akademievorhabens Forschungen zur Antiken Sklaverei (Mainz, 14. Oktober 2008) (= Forschungen zur antiken Sklaverei. Band 39). Franz Steiner, Stuttgart 2012, ISBN 978-3-515-09414-6.
- Handwörterbuch der antiken Sklaverei (= Forschungen zur antiken Sklaverei. Beiheft 5). 3 Bände, Franz Steiner, Stuttgart 2017, ISBN 978-3-515-10161-5.
