= Attalus I =

King of Pergamon, reigned 241–197 BC

Attalus I Soter
- Basileus
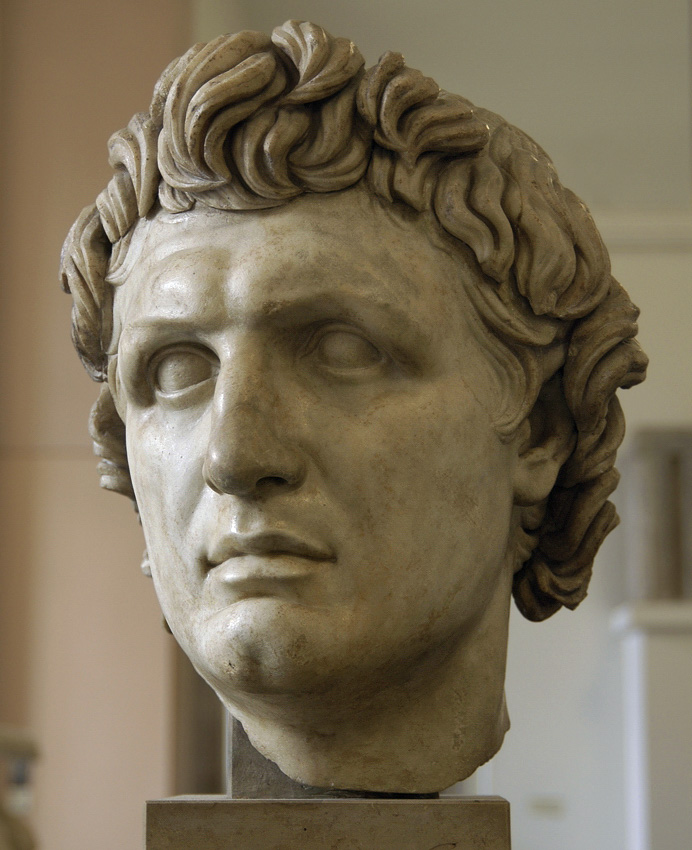
- Marble head found at Pergamon dated to the 3rd century BC, currently at the Pergamon Museum in Berlin; hypothesized to be depicting Attalus I

King of Pergamon
- Reign: 241–197 BC
- Predecessor: Eumenes I
- Successor: Eumenes II
- Born: 269 BC
- Died: 197 BC (aged 72)
- Spouse: Apollonis of Cyzicus
- Issue: Eumenes II; Attalus II; Philetaerus; Athenaeus
- Greek: Άτταλος Α΄ Σωτήρ
- Dynasty: Attalid dynasty
- Father: Attalus
- Mother: Antiochis

Attalus I (Ancient Greek: Ἄτταλος 'Attalos'), surnamed Soter (Greek: Σωτήρ, 'Savior'; 269–197 BC), was the ruler of the Greek polis of Pergamon (modern-day Bergama, Turkey) and the larger Pergamene Kingdom from 241 BC to 197 BC. He was the adopted son of King Eumenes I, whom he succeeded, and the first of the Attalid dynasty to assume the title of king, sometime around 240 to 235 BC. He was the son of Attalus and his wife Antiochis.

Attalus won an important victory, the Battle of the Caecus River, over the Galatians, a group of migratory Celtic tribes from Thrace, who had been plundering and exacting tribute throughout most of Asia Minor for more than a generation. The victory was celebrated with a triumphal monument at Pergamon (The Dying Gaul) and Attalus taking the surname "Soter" and the title of king. He participated in the first and second Macedonian Wars against Philip V of Macedon as a loyal ally of the Roman Republic, although Pergamene participation was ultimately rather minor in these wars. He conducted numerous naval operations throughout the Aegean, gained the island of Aegina for Pergamon during the first war and Andros during the second, twice narrowly escaping capture at the hands of Philip V. During his reign, Pergamon also repeatedly struggled with the neighboring Seleucid Empire to the east, resulting in both successes and setbacks.

Attalus styled himself as a protector of the freedoms of the Greek cities of Anatolia as well as the champion of Greeks against barbarians. He funded art and monuments in Pergamon and in Greek cities he sought to cultivate as allies. He died in 197 BC at the age of 72, shortly before the end of the second war, having suffered an apparent stroke while addressing a Boeotian war council some months before. He and his wife Apollonis were admired for their rearing of their four sons. He was succeeded as king by his son Eumenes II.

== Early life ==
Little is known about Attalus' early life. He was Greek and the son of Attalus and Antiochis. His father Attalus was the son of a brother (also called Attalus) of both Philetaerus, the founder of the Attalid dynasty, and Eumenes, the father of Eumenes I, Philetaerus' successor. The elder Attalus is recorded, along with his uncles, as providing generous donations to Delphi. His father also won fame as a charioteer, winning at Olympia, and was honored with a monument at Pergamon. It is conjectured the elder Attalus might have been considered a potential successor to Philetaerus, but Eumenes I succeeded to the throne instead. Attalus' mother Antiochis was probably related to the Seleucid royal family (perhaps a granddaughter of Seleucus I Nicator) with her marriage to Attalus' father likely arranged by Philetaerus to solidify his power.

At some point prior to 241 BC, Attalus' father died. If the elder Attalus had been heir designate at some point, he died before he could ever take the throne. The younger Attalus was adopted by Eumenes I, the incumbent dynast. After Eumenes' death in 241 BC, Attalus succeeded to the Pergamene throne.

== Defeat of the Galatians ==
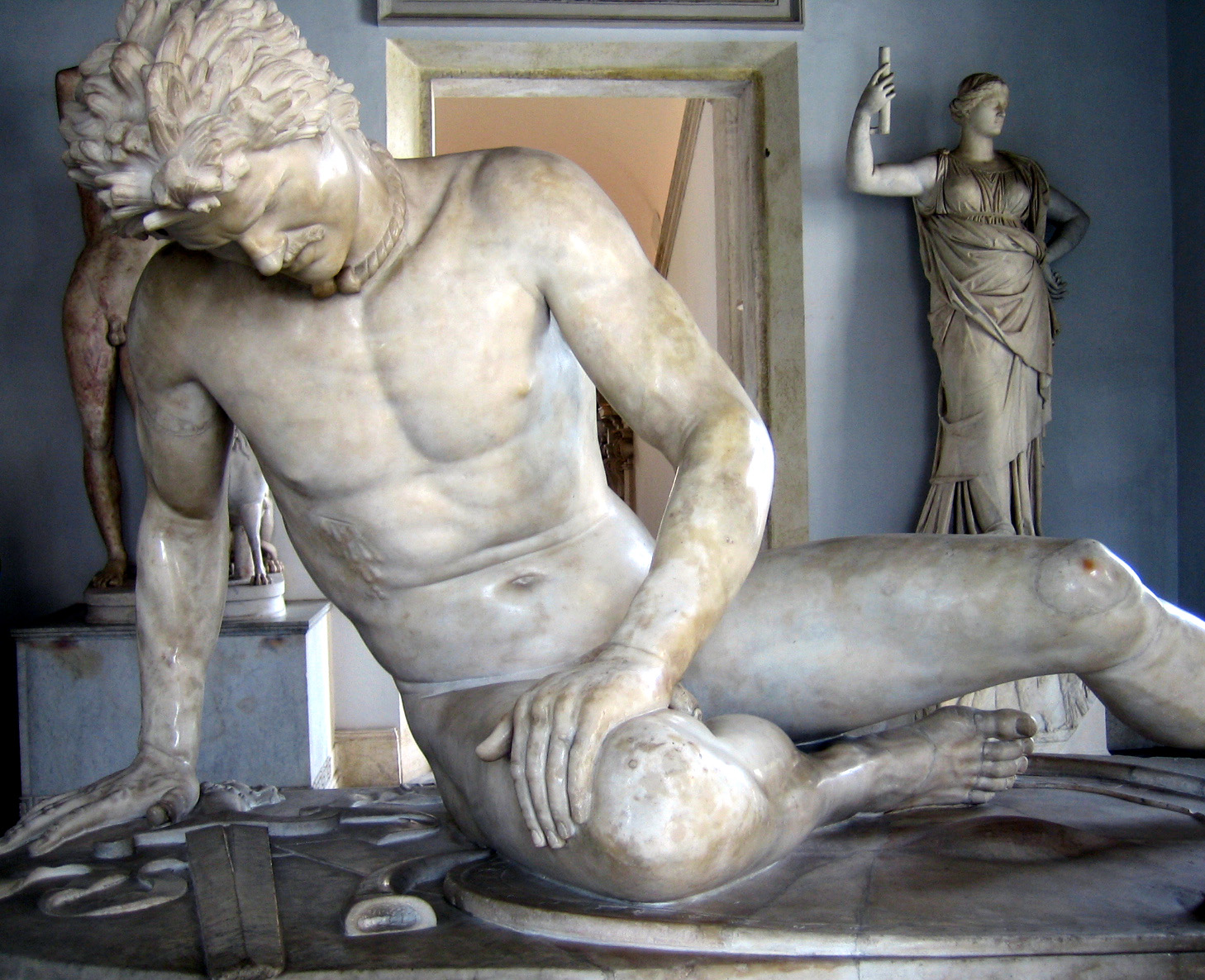
The Dying Gaul, a statue representing the defeat of the Galatians by Attalus, is a marble Roman copy of the now-lost ancient bronze original.

Little is known of the early reign of Attalus. The main recorded event of the era was a battle with the Galatians. According to the 2nd century AD Greek writer Pausanias, "the greatest of his achievements" was the defeat of the "Gauls" (Γαλάται). The Galatians were immigrant Celts from Thrace, who had recently settled in Galatia in central Asia Minor, and whom the Romans and Greeks called Gauls, associating them with the Celts of what is now France, Switzerland, and northern Italy. Since the time of Philetaerus, the first Attalid ruler, the Galatians had posed a problem for Pergamon, indeed for all of Asia Minor, by exacting tributes to avoid war or other repercussions. Eumenes I had (probably), along with other rulers, dealt with the Galatians by paying these tributes. Attalus however refused to pay them, being the first such ruler recorded to do so. As a consequence, the Galatians set out to attack Pergamon, sometime around 238–235 BC. Attalus met them near the sources of the river Caecus and decisively won the resulting Battle of the Caecus River.

The prestige gained by the victory caused Attalus to take the surname of Soter, "savior", following the example of Antiochus I. He also declared himself basileus, king. While this did not increase his practical authority as his adopted father had already ruled like a king, it formally severed any relationship with the Seleucid Empire's king as a superior suzerain. The victory would be the core element of Attalus' reputation and fame. Attalus presented himself as the victorious champion of Greeks against barbarians, and commissioned much artwork and sculptures commemorating himself and the Pergamene victory.

As with other Attalid rulers, Pergamene royal coinage depicted a middle-aged version of Philetaerus, the dynasty's founder. Around the 230s BC, the depiction of Philetaerus changed from a plain band to a diadem entwined with a laurel wreath, the symbol of victory, perhaps to celebrate the defeat of the Galatians.

Pausanias wrote of a surely invented oracle's prophecy which foretold the great victory, allegedly created a generation earlier:

Then having crossed the narrow strait of the Hellespont,
The destructive army of the Gauls shall pipe; they shall lawlessly
Ravage Asia; and God shall make it yet worse
For all who dwell by the shores of the sea
For a little while. But soon the son of Cronus shall stir up a helper for them,
A dear son of a Zeus-reared bull
Who shall bring a doom on all the Gauls.

Pausanias writes that by "son of a bull", the oracle Phaennis "meant Attalus, king of Pergamon, who was styled bull-horned". On the acropolis of Pergamon was erected a triumphal monument, which included the famous sculpture The Dying Gaul, commemorating this battle.

== Conflicts with the Seleucid Empire in Asia Minor ==
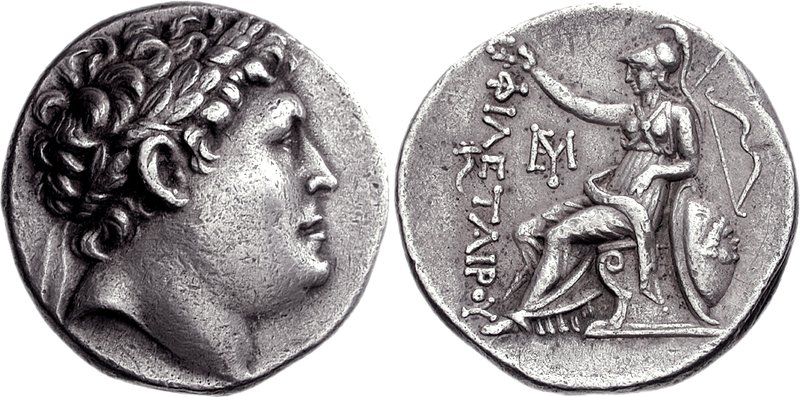
Tetradrachm struck during the reign of Attalus I, depicting Attalus' great uncle, Philetaerus, whose name ΦΙΛΕΤΑΙΡΟΥ is written on the reverse beside Athena.

Several years after the first victory over the Gauls, Pergamon was again attacked by the Gauls together with their ally Antiochus Hierax, the younger brother of Seleucus II Callinicus, and ruler of Seleucid Asia Minor from his capital at Sardis. Attalus defeated the Gauls and Antiochus at the Battle of Aphrodisium and again at a second battle in the east. Three subsequent battles were fought and won against Antiochus Hierax's forces, which fought without support from the Gauls: in Hellespontine Phrygia, where Antiochus was perhaps seeking refuge with his father-in law, Ziaelas the king of Bithynia; near Sardis in the spring of 228 BC; and, in the final conflict of the campaign, in Caria at the Battle of the Harpasus, the Harpasus river being a tributary of the Maeander.

As a result of these victories, Attalus gained putative control over all of Seleucid Asia Minor north of the Taurus Mountains. He was able to hold on to these gains in the face of repeated attempts by Seleucus III Ceraunus, eldest son and successor of Seleucus II, to recover the lost territory. That said, this influence was tenuous; later historians consider any attempt to translate military success into political hegemony in these areas fraught and unlikely to have been successful. Around 226–223 BC, Attalus erected a monument to his battlefield victories in the acropolis of Pergamon, dedicated to Zeus and Athena; a slight adjustment to the artwork on coinage also occurred.

Seleucus III was assassinated in 223 BC after crossing the Taurus into Asia Minor. Achaeus assumed control of the Seleucid army afterward. He was offered and refused the kingship in favor of Seleucus III's younger brother Antiochus III the Great, who then made Achaeus governor of Seleucid Asia Minor north of the Taurus. Achaeus embarked upon a remarkably successful campaign, rapidly reclaiming Asia Minor for the Seleucids. Within two years Achaeus had recovered all the lost Seleucid territories and "shut up Attalus within the walls of Pergamon". In a stroke of good fortune for Attalus, Achaeus revolted against Antiochus III around 220 BC and declared himself the Seleucid king.

After a period of peace, in 218 BC, while Achaeus was involved in an expedition to Selge south of the Taurus, Attalus, allied with some Thracian Gauls, recaptured his former territories in Western Asia Minor, establishing the Pergamese state as one of the powers of Asia Minor. However, Achaeus returned from victory in Selge in 217 BC and resumed hostilities with Attalus.

Under a treaty of alliance with Attalus, Antiochus III crossed the Taurus in 216 BC, attacked Achaeus and besieged Sardis, and in 214 BC, the second year of the siege, was able to take the city. However the citadel remained under Achaeus' control. Under the pretense of a rescue, Achaeus was finally captured and put to death, and the citadel surrendered. By 213 BC, Antiochus III had regained control of all of his provinces in the east of Asia Minor.

== First Macedonian War ==
Mediterranean region in 218 BC

While affairs in the east of his kingdom occupied much of his early reign, the west of Attalus' domain became more active later on. Attalus had sometime before 219 BC become allied with the Aetolian League, a union of Greek states in Aetolia in central Greece. He helped fund the fortification of Elaeus, an Aetolian stronghold in Calydonia, near the mouth of the river Acheloos. This would later bring Attalus into conflict with Philip V of Macedon, king of Antigonid Macedonia and the preeminent power in the Aegean Sea region, in what would eventually become the First Macedonian War. Attalus sought to burnish his regional reputation, more so than many of his contemporary rulers. In addition to fortifications, Attalus also funded art and monuments, such as a stoa at Delphi (then part of the Aetolian League).

Philip's alliance with Hannibal of Carthage in 215 BC caused concern in Rome, then involved in the Second Punic War. In 211 BC, a treaty was signed between Rome and the Aetolian League, a provision of which allowed for the inclusion of certain allies of the League, Attalus being one of these. Attalus was elected one of the two strategoi (generals) of the Aetolian League for the year 210/209 BC, and in 210 BC his troops probably participated in capturing the island of Aegina, acquired by Attalus as his base of operations in Greece.

In the following spring (209 BC), Philip marched south into Greece. Under command of Pyrrhias, Attalus' colleague as strategos, the allies lost two battles at Lamia. Attalus himself went to Greece in July 209 BC and was joined on Aegina by the Roman proconsul P. Sulpicius Galba who wintered there. Attalus only personally participated as a commander in the summer of 208 BC. That season, the combined fleet of thirty-five Pergamene and twenty-five Roman ships failed to take the Macedonian island of Lemnos, and occupied and plundered the countryside of the island of Peparethos (Skopelos) instead. Attalus and Sulpicius then attended a meeting in Heraclea Trachinia of the Council of the Aetolians, at which the Roman argued against making peace with Philip.

The Romans sacked both Oreus, on the northern coast of Euboea, and Opus, the chief city of eastern Locris. The spoils from Oreus had been reserved for Sulpicius, who returned there, while Attalus stayed to occupy and collect the spoils from Opus. With their forces divided, Philip moved a force to relieve Opus from the occupying Pergamene army. Attalus and his troops, caught by surprise, were barely able to escape to his ships, unarmed and in disorder.

After his inglorious retreat, Attalus learned that Prusias I, king of Bithynia and a relative of Philip V's by marriage, had crossed the border to attack Pergamene territory. Attalus now returned to Asia to meet them, although the details of this conflict are largely unrecorded. Soon after, the Romans also abandoned Greece to concentrate their forces against Hannibal, their objective of preventing Philip from aiding Hannibal having been achieved. In 206 BC the Aetolians sued for peace, accepting the conditions imposed by Philip. A treaty was drawn up at Phoenice in 205 BC, formally ending the war. Attalus was included as an adscriptus on the side of Rome. He retained Aegina, but had accomplished little else; Pergamene participation in the war was ultimately "rather ineffective". Since Prusias was also included in the treaty, the conflict between Pergamon and Bithynia also ended by that time.

== Introduction of the cult of the Magna Mater to Rome ==
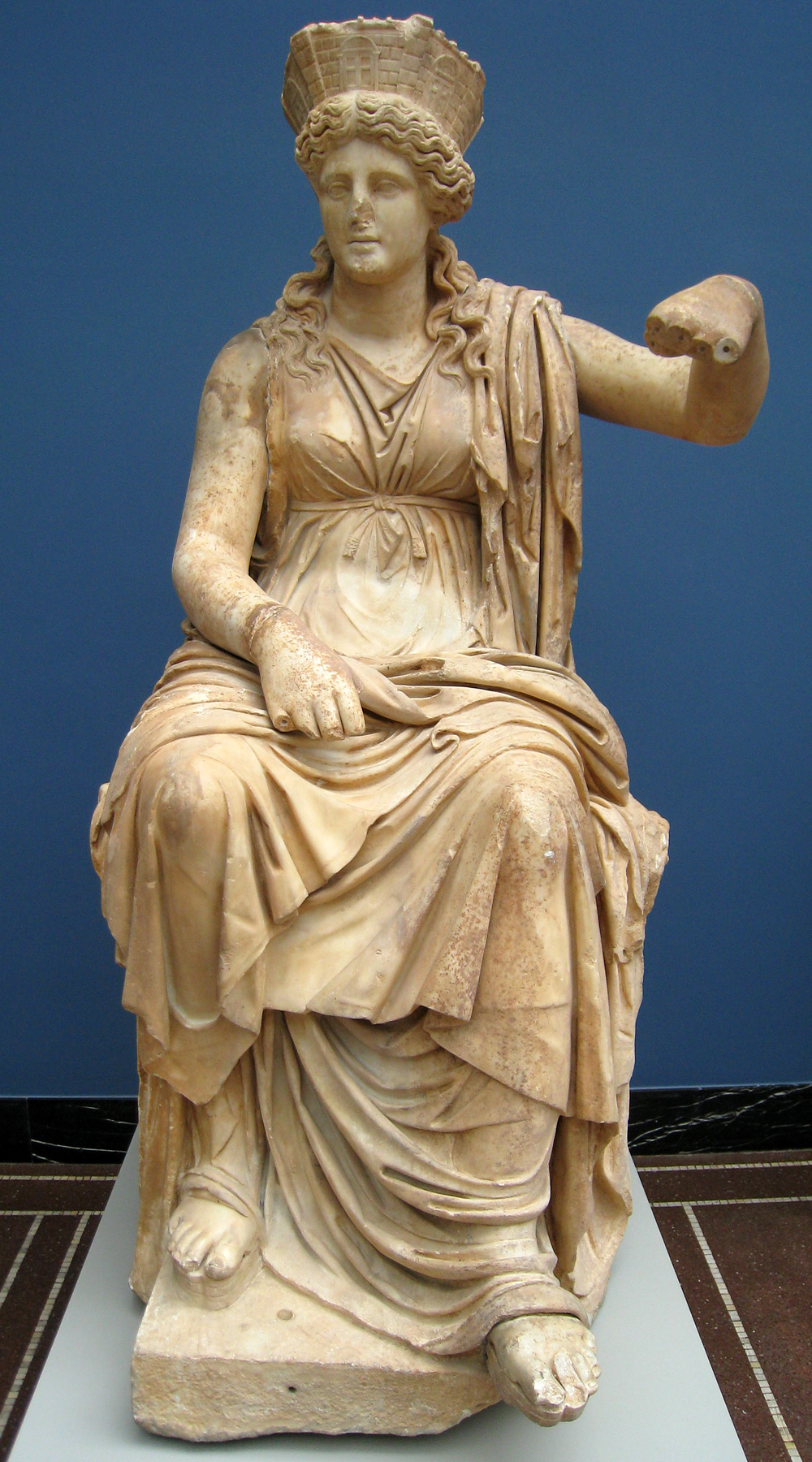
1st century BC Roman marble statue of Cybele

In 205 BC, following the Peace of Phoenice, Rome turned to Attalus, as its only friend in Asia, for help concerning a religious matter. The Second Punic War between Rome and Carthage was still continuing. A consultation of the Sibylline Books found verses saying that if a foreigner were to make war on Italy, he could be defeated if the Mater Deum Magna Idaea, the Great Mother Goddess, was brought to Rome. Additionally, an unusual number of meteor showers had been seen. The interpretation of the oracle of Delphi was that Rome needed to start a cult in Rome to this Mother Goddess to win the war.

A Roman delegation, led by M. Valerius Laevinus, was dispatched to Pergamon to seek Attalus' aid in gaining an appropriate artifact to bring to Rome. According to Livy, Attalus received the delegation warmly, and "handed over to them the sacred stone which the natives declared to be 'the Mother of the Gods', and bade them carry it to Rome." The ancient Phrygian goddess Cybele was thus introduced to Rome as the Magna Mater, and the Mother of Gods stone was said itself to be meteoric.

One aspect of the account which varies in sources is where exactly the stone came from. While Ovid's version says the Mother of Gods was found on Mount Ida, close to Pergamon, most other accounts say it came from Pessinus, which was far inland: a place where Pergamene influence was weak at best and Gallic influence was strong. Whether this was an error in Roman sources unfamiliar with the geography of Asia Minor, or Attalus was on friendly terms with the local Gallic tribes in central Asia Minor in this time period, is unclear.

== Macedonian hostilities of 201 BC ==
Prevented by the treaty of Phoenice from expansion in the west, Philip V of Macedon set out to extend his power in the Aegean and in Asia Minor. In the spring of 201 BC he took Samos and the Egyptian fleet stationed there. He then besieged Chios to the north. These events caused Attalus, allied with Rhodes, Byzantium and Cyzicus, to enter the war. A large naval battle occurred in the strait between Chios and the mainland, just southwest of Erythrae. According to Polybius, fifty-three decked warships and over one hundred and fifty smaller warships took part on the Macedonian side, with sixty-five decked warships and a number of smaller warships on the allied side. During the battle Attalus, having become isolated from his fleet and pursued by Philip, was forced to run his three ships ashore, narrowly escaping by spreading various royal treasures on the decks of the grounded ships, causing his pursuers to abandon the pursuit in favor of plunder.

The same year, Philip invaded Pergamon; although unable to take the defended city, in part due to precautions taken by Attalus to provide for additional fortifications, he demolished the surrounding temples and altars. Meanwhile, Attalus and Rhodes sent envoys to Rome, to register their complaints against Philip.

== Second Macedonian War ==
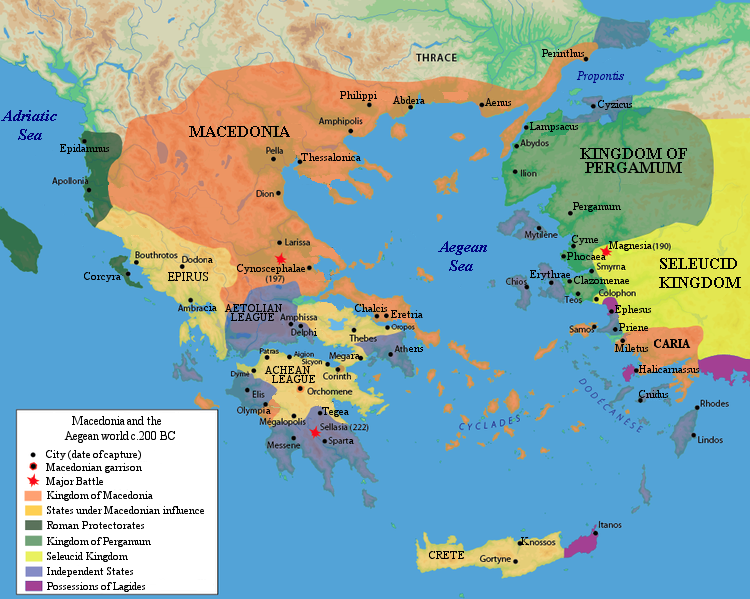
Aegean Sea region around 200 BC, showing Pergamon (light green), Macedonia (orange), the Seleucid Empire (yellow), and other alliances such as the Achaean League

In 200 BC, Attalus became involved in the Second Macedonian War. Acarnanians with Macedonian support invaded Attica, causing Athens, which had previously maintained its neutrality, to seek help from the enemies of Philip. Attalus, with his fleet at Aegina, received an embassy from Athens inviting him to the city. A few days later, he learned that Roman ambassadors were also at Athens, and decided to visit. With the Athenians desperate for allies, his reception was extraordinary. Polybius writes:

... in company with the Romans and the Athenian magistrates, he began his progress to the city in great state. For he was met, not only by all the magistrates and the knights, but by all the citizens with their children and wives. And when the two processions met, the warmth of the welcome given by the populace to the Romans, and still more to Attalus, could not have been exceeded. At his entrance into the city by the gate Dipylum the priests and priestesses lined the street on both sides: all the temples were then thrown open; victims were placed ready at all the altars; and the king was requested to offer sacrifice. Finally they voted him such high honors as they had never without great hesitation voted to any of their former benefactors: for, in addition to other compliments, they named a tribe after Attalus, and classed him among their eponymous heroes.

Two of the Athenian tribes named after Macedonians had recently been abolished, perhaps as recently as weeks before Attalus' visit, so the naming of these areas was open. A deme (suburb) was also named after Apollonis, Attalus' wife.

Sulpicius Galba, now consul, convinced Rome to declare war on Philip and asked Attalus to meet up with the Roman fleet and again conduct a naval campaign, harassing Macedonian possessions in the Aegean. In the spring of 199 BC, the combined Pergamon and Roman fleets took Andros in the Cyclades, the spoils going to the Romans and the island to Attalus. From Andros, the Pergamene forces sailed on an expedition. They made a fruitless attack on another Cycladic island, Kithnos; turned back north; scavenged the fields of Skiathos off the coast of Magnesia, for food; and continued north to Mende. The Pergamenes mounted a land assault at the city of Cassandrea, but were defeated and suffered heavy losses. They continued northeast along the Macedonian coast to Acanthus, which they sacked. This ended the expedition, their ships returning to Euboea with the spoils of Acanthus. On their return, the two leaders went to Heraclea to meet with the Aetolians, who under the terms of their treaty, had asked Attalus for a thousand soldiers. He refused, citing the Aetolians' own refusal to honor Attalus' request to attack Macedonia during Philip's attack on Pergamon two years earlier. Resuming operations, Attalus and the Romans attacked but failed to take Oreus. They left a small force at Oreus to invest it, and sailed across the straight to raid elsewhere in Thessaly, with Attalus attacking Pteleum while the Romans attacked Larissa Cremaste. Upon their return to Oreus and with siege equipment now ready, the city fell. The Romans enslaved captives and took them elsewhere, while the Attalids looted and occupied the city. The campaigning season now over, Attalus attended the Eleusinian Mysteries and then returned to Pergamon having been away for over two years.

In the spring of 198 BC, Attalus returned to Greece with twenty-three quinqueremes joining a fleet of twenty Rhodian decked warships at Andros, to complete the conquest of Euboea begun the previous year. Soon joined by the Romans, the combined fleets took Eretria and later Carystus. Thus, the allies controlled all of Euboea except for Chalcis. The allied fleet then sailed for Cenchreae in preparation for an attack on Macedonian Corinth. Meanwhile, the new Roman consul for that year, Titus Quinctius Flamininus, had learned that the Achaean League, allies of Macedon, had had a change in leadership which favored Rome. Attalus' relations with the rival Aetolian League had cooled after several broken promises on both sides, so mending relations with the Achaeans could potentially offer a new ally. With the hope of inducing the Achaeans to abandon Philip and join the allies, envoys were sent, including Attalus himself, to Sicyon, where they offered the incorporation of Corinth into the Achaean League. Attalus won the support of the Sicyonians after purchasing land sacred to Apollo for them, and they erected a colossal statue of him in their market place. Later gifts to Sicyon induced the city to institute annual animal sacrifices in Attalus' honor. A meeting of the Achaean League was convened. After a heated debate and the withdrawal of some of the delegates, the rest agreed to join the Roman alliance. Attalus led his army from Cenchreae (now controlled by the allies) through the Isthmus and besieged Corinth from the north, controlling the access to Lechaeum, the Corinthian port on the Gulf of Corinth. Meanwhile, the Romans moved their forces to the east of the city to control the approaches to Cenchreae, with the Achaeans held the west of Corinth. However, Corinth's garrison held out. Macedonian reinforcements arrived, the siege was abandoned, and the siege works were destroyed. Attalus and his army sailed for Piraeus.

Also in 198 BC, a renewed struggle with the Seleucid Empire began. King Antiochus III, seemingly taking advantage of Pergamene distraction with the Macedonian War, attacked while Pergamon's ability to defend itself was weak, threatening holdings in Asia Minor. Back in Greece, early in 197 BC, Flamininus summoned Attalus to join him at Elateia (now in Roman hands) and from there they traveled together to attend a Boeotian council in Thebes to encourage Boeotia to join the Roman side in the war. At the council Attalus spoke first, reminding the Boeotians of the many things he and his ancestors had done for them, but during his address he stopped talking and collapsed, with one side of his body paralyzed. Attalus was taken back to Pergamon to live out the remaining months of his life. He died around the time of the Battle of Cynoscephalae, which brought about the end of the Second Macedonian War.

At the end of his reign, Attalus' kingdom was "hardly any bigger than it had been at the beginning". Antiochus III had seized large amounts of Pergamene territory for his empire, with important putatively Attalid cities such as Phocaea and Thyatira in Seleucid possession. Attalus' successor, his son Eumenes II, would face a tough geopolitical situation. However, he had also made the city of Pergamon a great center of art and learning, and earned the respect of the Romans and others; historian Esther Hansen calls Attalus' reign not merely the longest of any Attalid monarch, but also "the most laudable".

== Family ==
Attalus married Apollonis, from Cyzicus. They had four sons, Eumenes, Attalus, Philetaerus and Athenaeus (after Apollonis' father). Apollonis was thought to be a model of motherly love. Polybius describes Apollonis as "a woman who for many reasons deserves to be remembered, and with honor. Her claims upon a favourable recollection are that, though born of a private family, she became a queen, and retained that exalted rank to the end of her life, not by the use of meretricious fascinations, but by the virtue and integrity of her conduct in private and public life alike."

The filial affection of the brothers as well as their upbringing is remarked on by several ancient sources. A decree of Antiochus IV praises "king Attalus and queen Apollonis ... because of their virtue and goodness, which they preserved for their sons, managing their education in this way wisely and well." An inscription at Pergamon represents Apollonis as saying that "she always considered herself blessed and gave thanks to the gods, not for wealth or empire, but because she saw her three sons guarding the eldest and him reigning without fear among those who were armed." When Attalus died in 197 BC at the age of 72, he was succeeded by his eldest son Eumenes II. Polybius writes "what is more remarkable than all, though he left four grown-up sons, he so well settled the question of succession, that the crown was handed down to his children's children without a single dispute." The dynasty avoiding infighting and scandal was a major element in giving them legitimacy and authority.

Apollonis died in the mid-second-century BC. In her honor, Attalus' sons built a temple in Cyzicus decorated with bas-reliefs representing several scenes of sons displaying love for their mothers, with one scene also showing love for a father.

== Bibliography ==
=== Ancient sources ===
- Livy, History of Rome, Rev. Canon Roberts (translator), Ernest Rhys (Ed.); (1905) London: J. M. Dent & Sons, Ltd.
- Pausanias, Description of Greece, Books I–II, (Loeb Classical Library) translated by W. H. S. Jones; Cambridge, Massachusetts: Harvard University Press; London, William Heinemann Ltd. (1918) ISBN 0-674-99104-4.
- Polybius, Histories, Evelyn S. Shuckburgh (translator); London, New York. Macmillan (1889); Reprint Bloomington (1962).
- Strabo, Geography, Books 13–14, translated by Horace Leonard Jones; Cambridge, Massachusetts: Harvard University Press; London: William Heinemann, Ltd. (1924) ISBN 0-674-99246-6.

=== Modern sources ===
- Allen, Reginald E. (1983). The Attalid Kingdom: A Constitutional History. Oxford: Clarendon Press. ISBN 0-19-814845-3.
- Austin, Michel M. (2006). "The Attalids of Pergamum". The Hellenistic World from Alexander to the Roman Conquest. Cambridge University Press. ISBN 0-521-82860-0.
- Bradford, Alfred S.; Pamela M. Bradford (2001). With arrow, sword, and spear: a history of warfare in the ancient world. Greenwood Publishing Group. p. 121. ISBN 978-0-275-95259-4.
- Dreyfus, Renée; Schraudolph, Ellen (1996). "Attalid Silver Coinage of the Attic Weight Standard". Pergamon: The Telephos Frieze from the Great Altar, Volume 2. University of Texas Press. ISBN 978-0-88401-091-3.
- Errington, R.M. (1993). "Rome against Philip and Antiochus". In Walbank, F.W.; Astin, A.E. (eds.). The Cambridge Ancient History. Vol. VII. Cambridge University Press. ISBN 0-521-23448-4.
- Erskine, Andrew (2003). Troy between Greece and Rome: Local Tradition and Imperial Power. Oxford University Press, USA. ISBN 978-0-19-926580-0.
- Grainger, John D. (2002). "Approaches". The Roman War of Antiochus the Great. Brill Publishers. ISBN 90-04-12840-9.
- Green, Peter (1993). "The Road to Sellasia". Alexander to Actium. University of California Press. pp. 248–265. ISBN 0-520-08349-0.
- Gruen, Erich S. (1986). "Patrocinium and Clientela". The Hellenistic World and the Coming of Rome. University of California Press. ISBN 978-0-520-05737-1.
- Gruen, Erich S. (1990). "The Advent of the Magna Mater". Studies in Greek Culture and Roman Policy. Brill Publishers. ISBN 90-04-09051-7.
- Hansen, Esther V. (1971). The Attalids of Pergamon (2nd ed.). Cornell University Press. ISBN 0-8014-0615-3.
- Heinen, Heinz (1984). "The Syrian–Egyptian Wars and the New Kingdoms of Asia Minor". In Wallbank; Frank William (eds.). The Cambridge Ancient History. Vol. V. Cambridge University Press. ISBN 0-521-23445-X.
- Hurwit, Jeffrey M. (1999). "The Hellenistic and Roman Acropolis". The Athenian Acropolis. CUP Archive. ISBN 0-521-41786-4.
- Kaye, Noah (2022). The Attalids of Pergamon and Anatolia. Cambridge University Press. ISBN 9781009279567.
- Kosmetatou, Elizabeth (2003). "The Attalids of Pergamon". In Erskine; Andrew (eds.). A Companion to the Hellenistic World. Oxford: Blackwell. pp. 159–174. ISBN 1-4051-3278-7.
- Mitchell, Stephen (1995). "The Celts in Anatolia". Anatolia. Oxford University Press. ISBN 0-19-815029-6.
- Paton, W. R. (ed.), Greek Anthology, Volume I: Book 1: Christian Epigrams, Book 2: Description of the Statues in the Gymnasium of Zeuxippus, Book 3: Epigrams in the Temple of Apollonis at Cyzicus, Book 4: Prefaces to the Various Anthologies, Book 5: Erotic Epigrams, translated by W. R. Paton. Revised by Michael A. Tueller, Loeb Classical Library No. 67, Cambridge, Massachusetts, Harvard University Press, 2014. ISBN 978-0-674-99688-5. Online version at Harvard University Press.
- Pollitt, Jerome Jordan (1986). Art in the Hellenistic Age. Cambridge University Press. ISBN 9780521276726.
- Walbank, Frank William (1967). A Historical Commentary on Polybius. Vol. 2. London: Oxford University Press..
- Warrior, Valerie M. (1996). "Events in Eastern Mediterranean". The Initiation of the Second Macedonian War. Franz Steiner Verlag. ISBN 3-515-06853-8.
- Wilson, Nigel Guy (2006). Encyclopedia of Ancient Greece. Routledge. pp. 114–115, 593. ISBN 978-0-415-97334-2.

Regnal titles
Preceded by Eumenes I	King of Pergamon; 241–197 BC	Succeeded by Eumenes II
