= Battle of the Harpasus =

Battle between Attalus I and Antiochus Hierax

Date	229 BC
Location	Harpasus river, Caria (modern-day Turkey)
Result	Pergamese victory

Belligerents
Kingdom of Pergamon	Seleucid Empire

Commanders and leaders
Attalus I	Antiochus Hierax

The Battle of the Harpasus was fought in 229 BC between the Pergamese and Seleucid armies on the banks of the Harpasus River, a tributary of the Maeander River in Caria. The battle on the Harpasus was the last battle of the war between King Attalus I of Pergamon and the Seleucid prince Antiochus Hierax over dominion of western Anatolia. Attalus won a decisive victory and Hierax started a failed campaign in Mesopotamia that would lead to his defeat and later death at Egypt.
