= Eumenes I =

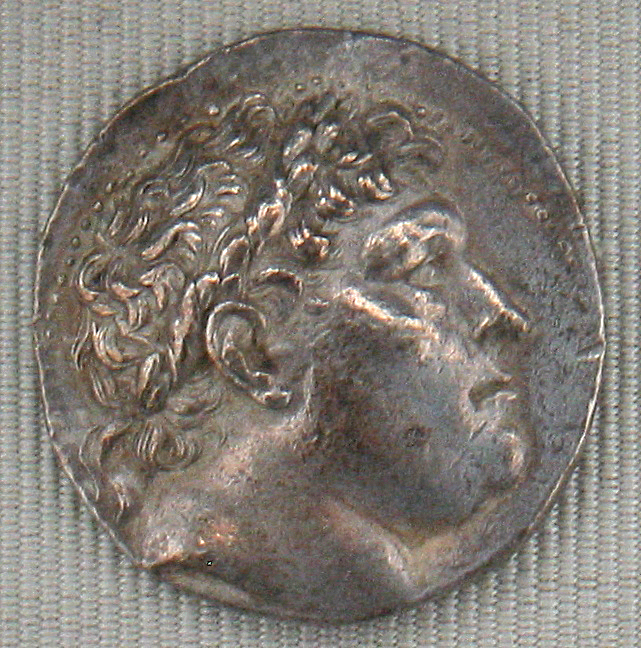
- Coin of Eumenes. Cabinet des Médailles, Paris.

King of Pergamon
- Reign: 263–241 BC
- Predecessor: Philetaerus
- Successor: Attalus I
- Died: 241 BC
- Greek: Ευμένης Α΄
- Dynasty: Attalid dynasty
- Father: Eumenes (son of Attalus)
- Mother: Satyra

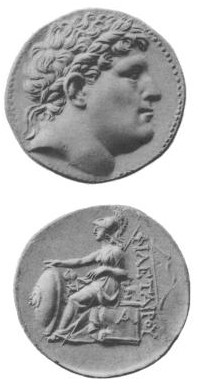
Coin struck during the reign of Eumenes I, depicting the head of Eumenes' uncle Philetaerus on the obverse and seated Athena, patron deity of the city of Pergamon, on the reverse. The writing reads ΦΙΛΕΤΑΙΡΟΥ (PHILETAEROU), "(coin) of Philetaerus".

Eumenes I (Ancient Greek: Εὐμένης) was dynast (ruler) of the city of Pergamon in Asia Minor from 263 BC until his death in 241 BC. He was the son of Eumenes, the brother of Philetaerus, the founder of the Attalid dynasty, and Satyra, daughter of Poseidonius. As he had no children, Philetaerus adopted Eumenes to become his heir.

Although nominally under Seleucid control, Pergamon under Philetaerus enjoyed considerable autonomy. However, upon his succession, Eumenes, perhaps with the encouragement of Ptolemy II, who was at war with the Seleucids, revolted, defeating the Seleucid king Antiochus I near the Lydian capital of Sardis in 261 BC. He was thus able to free Pergamon, and greatly increase the territories under his control. In his new possessions, he established garrison posts in the north at the foot of Mount Ida called Philetaireia after his adoptive father, and in the east, northeast of Thyatira near the sources of the river Lycus, called Attaleia after his grandfather, and he extended his control south of the river Caïcus to the Gulf of Cyme as well. Demonstrating his independence, he began to strike coins with the portrait of Philetaerus, while his predecessor had still depicted Seleucus I Nicator.

After the revolt from the Seleucids, there are no records of any further hostilities involving Pergamon during Eumenes' rule, even though there continued to be conflict between the Seleucids and the Ptolemies, and even though the Galatian Gauls were continually plundering throughout the region. If Eumenes was able to keep Pergamon free from the ravages of the Gauls, it was probably because he paid them tribute.

Although never assuming the title of "king," Eumenes did exercise all of the powers of one. Imitating other Hellenistic rulers, a festival in Eumenes' honour, called Eumeneia, was instituted in Pergamon.

It is not known whether he had children. A "Philetaerus son of Eumenes" is mentioned in an inscription in the town of Thespiae; some regard him as Eumenes' son, who would then have died before his father's death in 241. Eumenes adopted his first cousin once removed, Attalus I, who succeeded him as ruler of Pergamon.

== Bibliography ==
- Hansen, Esther V. (1971). The Attalids of Pergamon. Ithaca, New York: Cornell University Press; London: Cornell University Press Ltd. ISBN 0-8014-0615-3.
- Kosmetatou, Elizabeth (2003) "The Attalids of Pergamon," in Andrew Erskine, ed., A Companion to the Hellenistic World. Oxford: Blackwell: pp. 159–174. ISBN 1-4051-3278-7. text
- Livy, History of Rome, Rev. Canon Roberts (translator), Ernest Rhys (Ed.); (1905) London: J. M. Dent & Sons, Ltd.
- Pausanias, Description of Greece, Books I-II, (Loeb Classical Library) translated by W. H. S. Jones; Cambridge, Massachusetts: Harvard University Press; London, William Heinemann Ltd. (1918) ISBN 0-674-99104-4.
- Strabo, Geography, Books 13–14, (Loeb Classical Library) translated by Horace Leonard Jones; Cambridge, Massachusetts: Harvard University Press; London: William Heinemann, Ltd. (1924) ISBN 0-674-99246-6.

Regnal titles
| Preceded by Philetaerus | Ruler of Pergamon; 263–241 BC | Succeeded by Attalus I |
