= Bithynian coinage =

Coinage of the kings of Bithynia

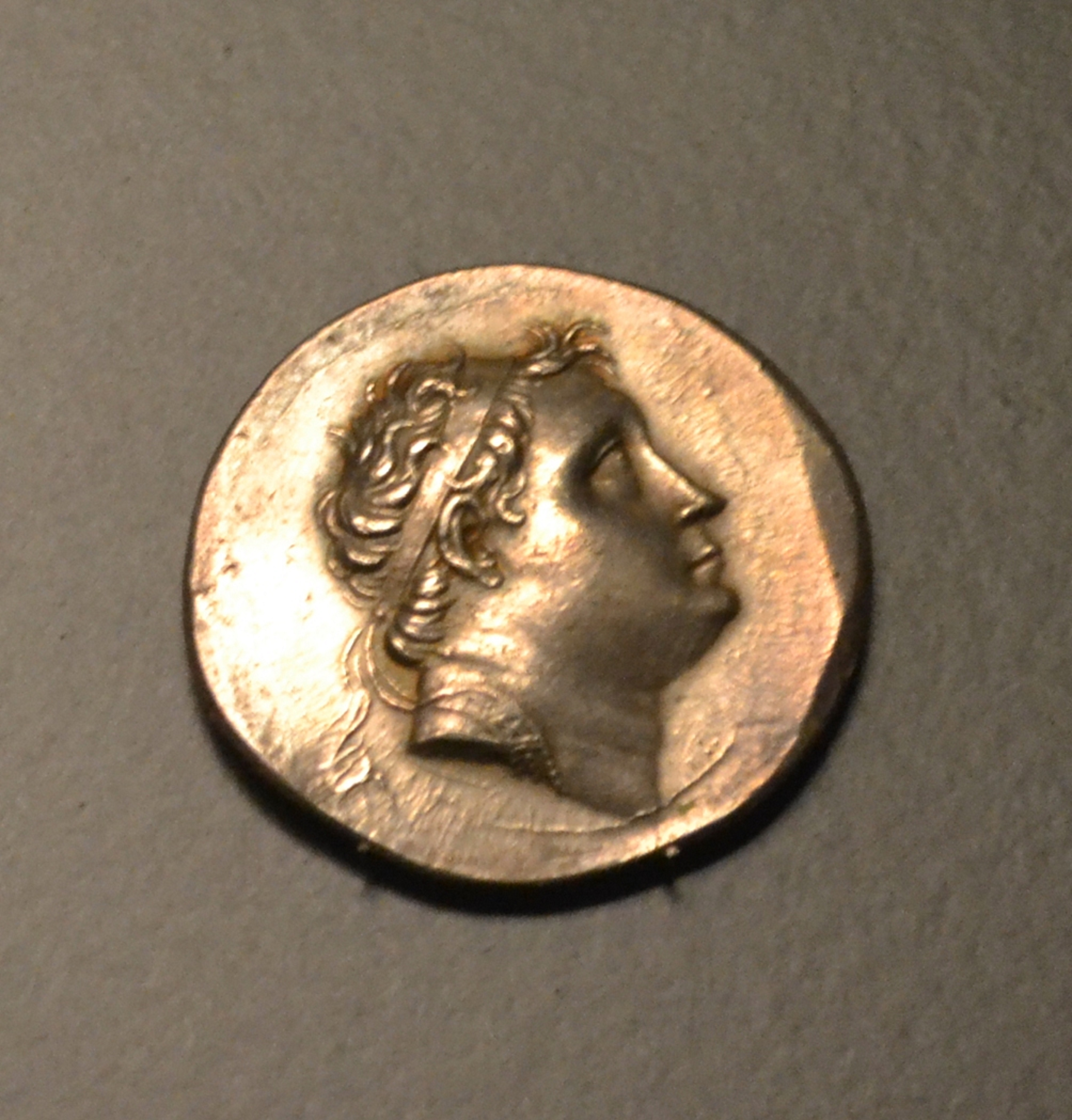
Tetradrachm of Nicomedes II

Bithynian coinage refers to coinage struck by the Kingdom of Bithynia that was situated on the coast of the Black Sea.

== Extent of monetization ==
Asia Minor is known for having kingdoms that issued abundant coinage during some points in their history. After Pergamon under the Attalid dynasty expanded, smaller kingdoms exploited the political situation and increased their power in the region. Bithynia, Cappadocia and Pontus are well-known and studied for their abundant coinage at certain times. Bithynian kingdom incorporated the most monetized areas under its domain when compared to the other two kingdoms. Bithynian rulers struck long and continuous series of silver and bronze coinage. Elsewhere, Cappadocians are primarily known for their military issues of coins, and the less monetized Pontic region primarily struck bronze coinage.

The purpose of the first royal Bithynian and Cappadocian bronze coinage is still unknown.

== History ==
The first king was Zipoetes I (c. 298 BC – c. 279 BC). It is thought that there was no coinage struck during his reign.

The first Bithynian king to strike coins was Nicomedes I (c. 280 BC – c. 250 BC). He is primarily known for bringing the Gauls known as Galatians to Asia Minor in 277 BC to fight against his brother and Antiochus I. This short-sighted action brought trouble for local Greeks for a century. In the early 260s BC, possibly in 264 BC according to Eusebius, he moved the capital to Nicomedia on the Propontis. There was a mint in the new capital. Silver tetradrachms and drachms of the Attic weight are known. Nicomedes I is known to have struck some bronze coinage too. Both Bithynian and Cappadocian coinages were started with minor series of bronze coins.

The successor of Nicomedes I was Ziaelas (c. 250 BC – 230 BC). He is known for having minted bronze coinage. However, only a few specimens have survived.

The reign of Prusias I (c. 232 BC – 182 BC) saw the birth of a more regular silver and bronze coinage for the kingdom. The first large issues of coins can thus be attributed to him. The bronze coinages of Prusias I and Prusias II have not been differentiated in the most common catalogues. However, those related to Ziaelas can be attributed to Prusias I.

Nicomedes II is notable for having struck the first gold staters in the kingdom's history. Those coins had his portrait on their obverse, and a galloping horseman on the reverse. He also introduced the year number of the Bithynian era on his coins, replacing the Seleucid era.

Both Nicomedes III and Nicomedes IV struck similar tetradrachms to those of their predecessor Nicomedes II.

== End of the kingdom ==
On the death of king Nicomedes IV in 74 BC the kingdom was bequeathed to the Roman Empire, and subsequently reconstituted as a Roman province. It was later part of the province of Bithynia and Pontus. Roman administration saw introduction of a new provincial currency, and the Bithynian polity's capital was moved back to Nicomedia.

During Roman rule, as many as 29 provincial cities in the combined province of Bithynia and Pontus issued coinage during the 2nd century AD. These cities on the Bithynian region included Apamea Myrlea, Bithynium, Nicaea, Nicomedia and Tium.

== See also ==
- List of rulers of Bithynia
- Pontic coinage
