= Pergamene-Bithynian Wars =

Series of Anatolian conflicts in antiquity

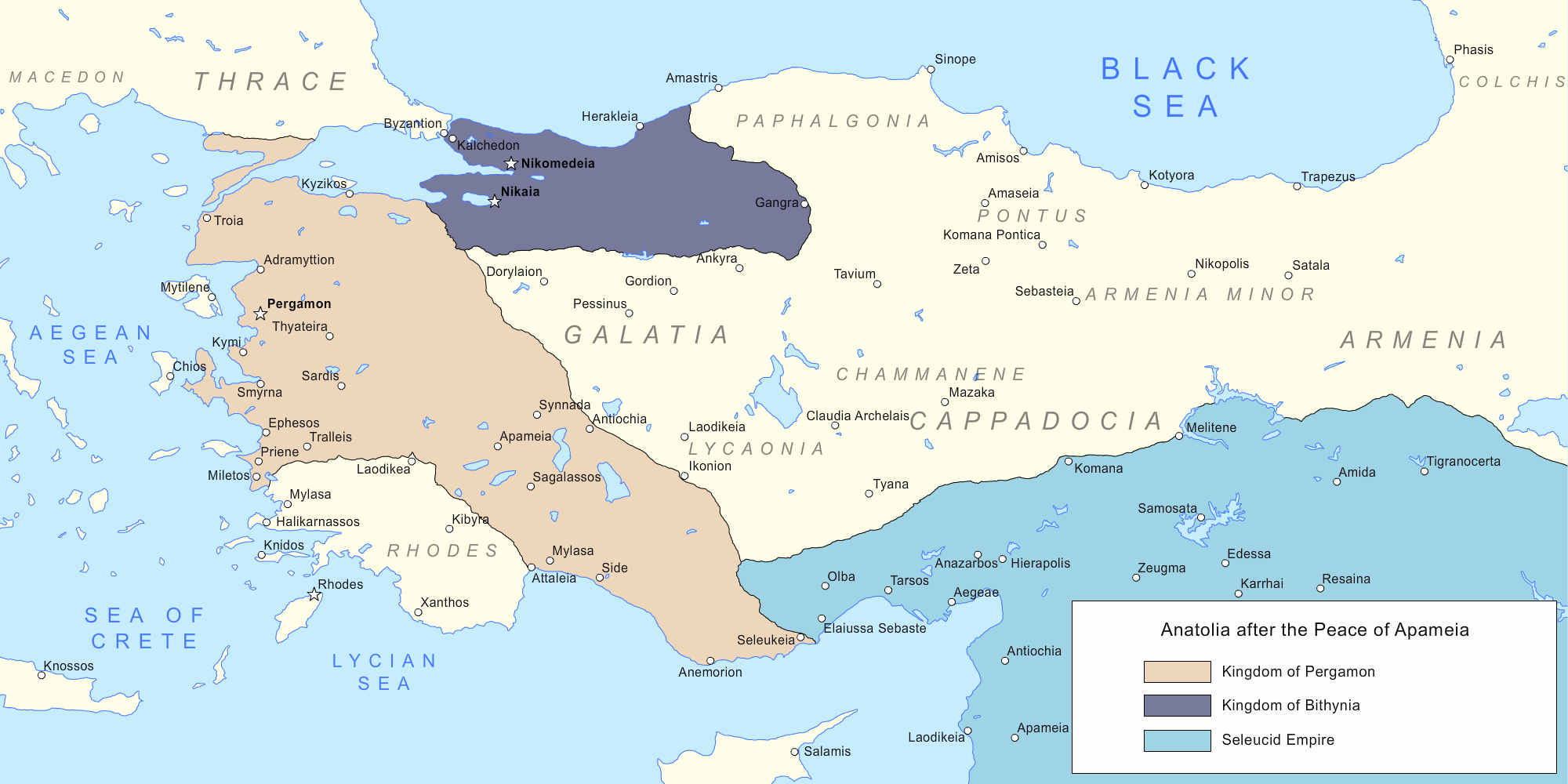
- Anatolia after the Treaty of Apamea
Date	c. 209-154 BC
Location	Western Anatolia

Belligerents
Kingdom of Pergamon; Seleucid Empire (from 188 and again in 175); Roman Republic (from 195); Kingdom of Cappadocia (from 188); Kingdom of Pontus (until 184); Paphlagonia (from 184); Kingdom of Bithynia (from 188); Cretan League (184-c. 170); Likely numerous states near the Black Sea and Armenia	Kingdom of Bithynia (until 188); Kingdom of Macedon (until 179); Seleucid Empire (until 188 and again in 178); Galatia; Kingdom of Pontus (from 184)

Commanders and leaders
Attalus; Eumenes II; Attalus II Philadelphus; Manlius Vulso; Ariarathes IV; Prusias II of Bithynia	Prusias I Prusias II; Hannibal; Athenaeus of Macedonia; Ortiagon; Antiochus III; Pharnaces I

The Pergamene-Bithynian Wars were a series of three conflicts taking place from 209 to 154 BC. The initial war was sparked by a Bithynian invasion of upper Pergamon. Following the invasion, the king of Pergamon, Attalus, rushed back to defend his territories. At a similar time, the Seleucid Empire invaded the eastern and southern regions of Pergamon. Following the war, Eumenes II, son of Attalus inherited a much smaller and diminished kingdom. However, after the Roman-Seleucid War, the Treaty of Apameia granted Pergamon vast territories in western Anatolia.

== First Pergamene-Bithynian War (209-205 BC) ==
In 209, while Attalus was busy with matters in Macedonia, Prusias I invaded alongside Antiochus III and took vast swaths of territory in the north, east, and south before Attalus could return. When he eventually returned, he reconquered some territory in the north, settling with a peace in 205, wherein most territory was annexed by the Seleucids.

== Interbellum (205-184 BC) ==
After the treaty in 205 BC, Pergamon remained an influential state in western Anatolia. From 197, Pergamon was much smaller and "diminished", according to Polybius. This no doubt means that even though vast Pergamene territories were annexed by the neighboring Seleucids, they still remained a strong power in West Asia until the accession of Eumenes II Soter.

Throughout the interbellum period, Pergamon and Bithynia were both pinned in a cold war, both attempting to gain favorable alliances to outclass the other. Pergamon's foreign policy at this time remained to fight with the Romans in all conflicts they could, eventually fighting four conflicts in the 20 year period: the Cretan War in 205, the Laconian War in 195, the Roman–Seleucid war in 192, and the Galatian War in 189.

=== Origins of the Second War ===
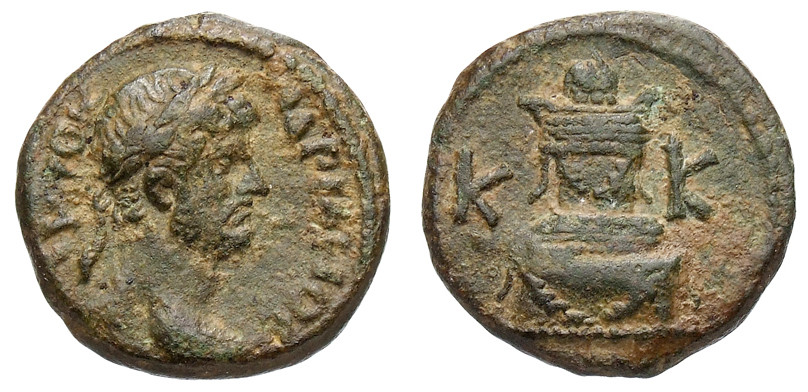
Coin of the Cretan League

In the months before the Second-Pergamene-Bithynian War, the Kingdom of Pergamon signed a treaty with 31 cities known as the Cretan League. Some of the cities included are Malla, Latos, Hierapythna, Arkades, and Priansos (Priansus). The treaty also included the strongest cities in Crete, Gortyna and Knossos. However, there is substantial evidence that shows that the Cretan League collapsed around the year 170.

== Second Pergamene-Bithynian War (184-179 BC) ==
The second and arguably largest Pergamene-Bithynian War broke out when Pharnaces I of Pontus besieged the port of Sinope, at the time owned by Paphlagonia. Rome attempted to mitigate the threat via diplomacy, but war was not prevented. Instead, a major conflict broke out, drawing in nearly every major state in the Anatolian peninsula and some states along the Black Sea and Armenia.

=== Eumenes' journey ===
During the war, Eumenes II invaded Galatia. It's stated that he traveled deep as far as the Halys River, wherein he rendezvoused with Ariarathes IV of Cappadocia, his father-in-law, and Mourzius of Paphlagonia and Prusias II of Bithynia.

== Third Pergamene-Bithynian War (156/4 BC) ==
The Third Pergamene-Bithynian War began in either 156 or 154 BC when Bithynia invaded Pergamon. When the war broke out, Attalus' country was ravaged by Prusias II. The Romans, after hearing of this, sent word to Prusias to halt his attack immediately. Prusias, slow to obey, continued. The ambassadors of Rome ordered him to obey the Senate and return to their mutual border with 1,000 cavalry, where Attalus would be waiting with the same number.

Prusias ostensibly told the ambassadors he'd do so, while actually bringing his entire army as if heading toward a pitched battle. When Attalus heard of this, they quickly attempted to intercept Prusias. Meanwhile, Prusias had been continuing his war in Pergamon. He had seized the beasts of burden of Rome and destroyed the stronghold of Nicephorium, burning down its temples, and eventually besieged Pergamon. When Rome eventually found out of the war, they ordered Prusias to compensate Attalus. Fearing a war with Rome, Prusias obeyed the order and signed a peace with Attalus.

== Aftermath ==
After the war, Bithynia was forced to pay Pergamon 500 talents of silver and transfer 20 decked ships. Prusias II, disliked more than his son, Nicomedes, sent him to live in Rome in 149. Eventually, after finding out Nicomedes had a favorable reputation there, he petitioned the senate to release him of his indemnities to Attalus. His ambassador to Rome, Menas, was told that, if Bithynia were to secure a remission of payment, to spare Nicomedes. If otherwise, to kill him at Rome. For this purpose, Prusias II sent a number of boats and 2,000 soldiers.

Eventually, the fine was not remitted. But, Menas, seeing that Nicomedes was an estimable and attractive man, was at a loss. He wouldn't dare to kill him, nor would he return to Bithynia. The two formed a plot against Prusias and, alongside Attalus, formed a guard of the 2,000 men originally sent to kill Nicomedes, instead now to kill Prusias. Eventually, after Nicomedes forced his abdication, Prusias was killed.
