= Prusias =

Prusias may refer to:

People

- Two kings of ancient Bithynia
  - Prusias I of Bithynia
  - Prusias II of Bithynia

Places and jurisdictions

- Prusias ad Hypium, city in the Roman province of Honorias
- Prusias and Prusias ad Mare, former alternate names for the ancient city of Cius in Bithynia

Other

- Prusias (spider), a spider genus in the family Sparassidae

== See also ==
- Monument of Prusias II
- Prusa (disambiguation)
- Prussia
