= Pontic coinage =

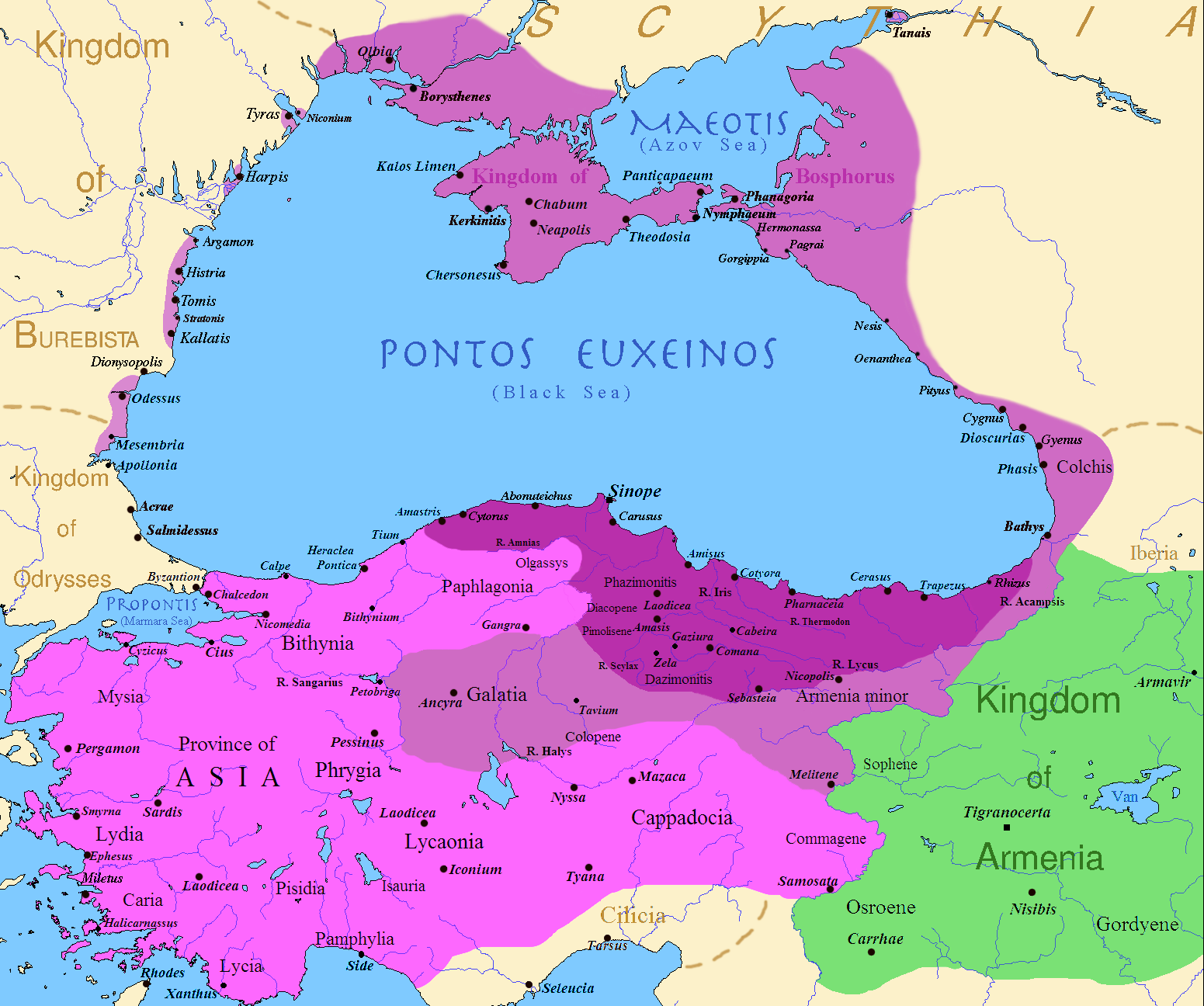
Pontic territory before the reign of Mithridates VI (dark purple), after his early conquests (purple) and his conquests in the first Mithridatic wars (pink). Kingdom of Armenia (green) was a Pontic ally.

Pontic coinage probably began during the reign of Mithridates II of Pontus, in the 3rd century BC. Early Pontic coinage imitated Macedonian coinage with Alexander the Great's portraits. Later coinage is well known for its high degree of realism in portraits of the Pontic kings, who were proud of their Iranian ancestry. Pontic coin portraiture developed in an artistic environment that was relatively isolated from wider Hellenistic tradition. However, Mithridates V and his son Mithridates VI partially abandoned oriental influences in coin portraiture.

Pontic mints experimented with new materials for coinage. Pure copper and brass were used in mints during the reign of Mithridates VI. Some of the earliest known coins made from brass are from his mints. Mithridates VI's rule and wars resulted in a wide expansion in the number of mints and struck coinage. Earlier Pontic coinage attributable to prior rulers is very rare.

Pontic coinage eventually managed to gain a wide acceptance within the eastern Mediterranean region.

== Evolution of Pontic coinage ==
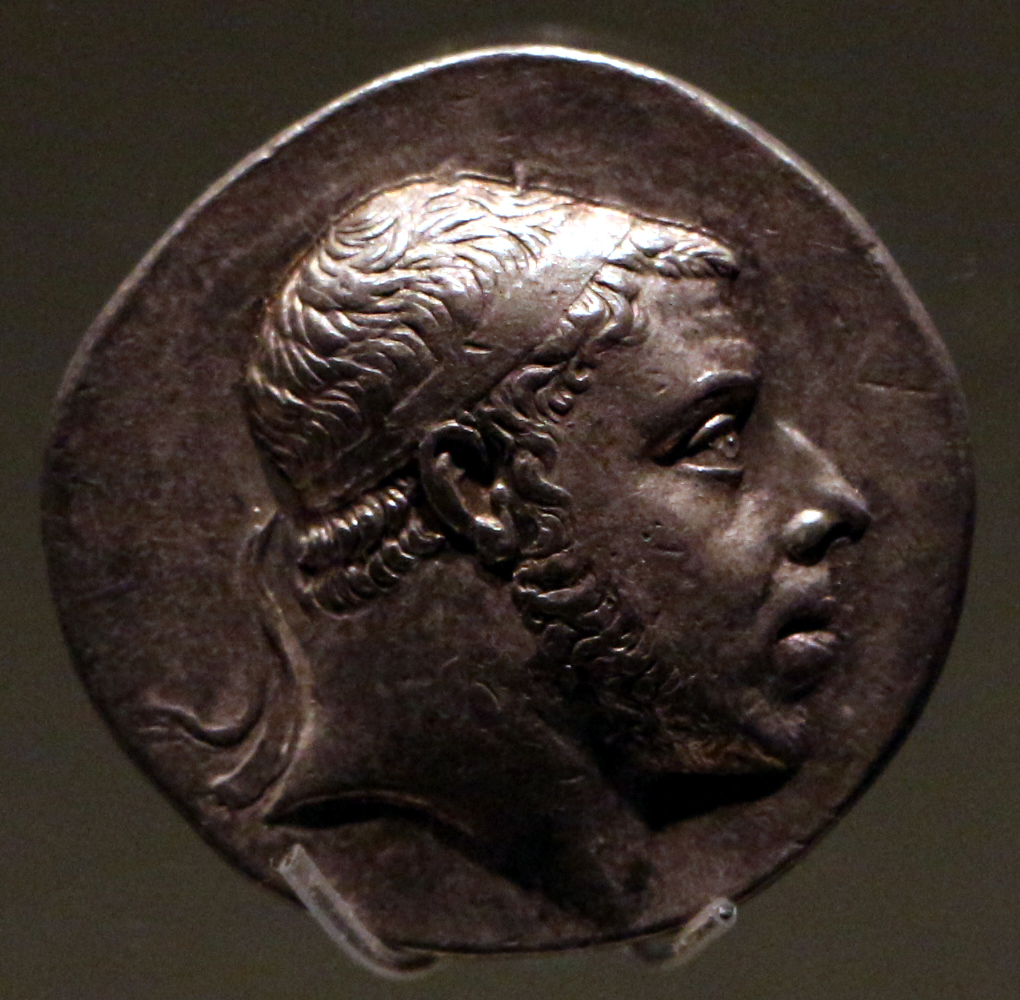
Coin of Pharnaces I

Prior to the Kingdom of Pontus, the Pontic region had autonomous, mostly coastal, cities with Greek backgrounds. Cities with mints were almost exclusively Greek colonies.

It is likely that the first coinage was struck during Mithridates II's reign, which is assumed to have lasted from approximately 255 to 220 BC. The first Pontic coinage mimicked other coinage with Alexander the Great's image on them. Mithridates III had issued a substantial amount of silver coinage by the end of his reign. He was also the first Pontic ruler to have a coin with his own portrait.

Prior to the reign of Mithridates VI, Pontic coinage is very rare. This has complicated studies of royal Pontic coinage. However, chronology of the Pontic coinage is well known from research. For instance, Mithridates VI dated most of his coins by the Bithynian year and by month.

There was a distinction between royal and city coinage. Royal coinage was struck on gold and silver. They also had the king's image and name on them. Coinage produced by cities was made from bronze and had the name of the city on the reverse side of the coin. Coinage struck autonomously by cities was discontinued for a time, as the cities lost their autonomy under the reign of Pharnakes I. Mithridates VI restored the privilege of cities to have their own coinage, but he retained some control, as can be deduced from the standardization of local coinage.

Pontic coinage has very fine portraits of their kings. Only Greco-Bactrian coinage is minted in such a realistic detail. Greek engravers were hired to carve coin dies used in the minting process. Pontic ruling dynasty was very proud of its Iranian descent, and the portraits clearly show their oriental features. Mithridates III struck a coin with a Zeus holding an eagle on one side, and the other side portrayed himself as a non-idealized bearded old man with a short hair. It was customary to have more realistic coin portraits in the east. However, the Pontic dynasty had married early in the Seleucid royal line. The Pontic Kingdom remained stubbornly resistant to foreign influence. Despite the ruling dynasty's Iranian origins, the Pontic state is considered to be a Hellenistic state. Most of the population was also ethnically Iranian.

Pontic portraiture developed outside the typical Hellenistic art. Mithridates V was the first king who had a relatively idealized portraiture about himself in coinage. The trend was further developed by his son Mithridates VI. The trend may have started from wishes of Mithridates V to show his Greek side more than his oriental background.

Late Hellenistic Pontic coinage have been found around the Mediterranean. This may indicate mobility of people and goods from the period contemporary with the Pontic kingdom. Pontic coinage has been found from same coin hoards together with other Hellenistic coinage. Such hoards have been found from the Near East and in south-eastern Anatolia. It is likely that Pontic coins were widely accepted in the eastern Mediterranean region. The Kingdom of Bosporus was governed after its conquest by a son of Mithridates VI. Pontic coinage has been found from northern shores of the Black Sea.

== Coinage during Mithridates VI's reign ==
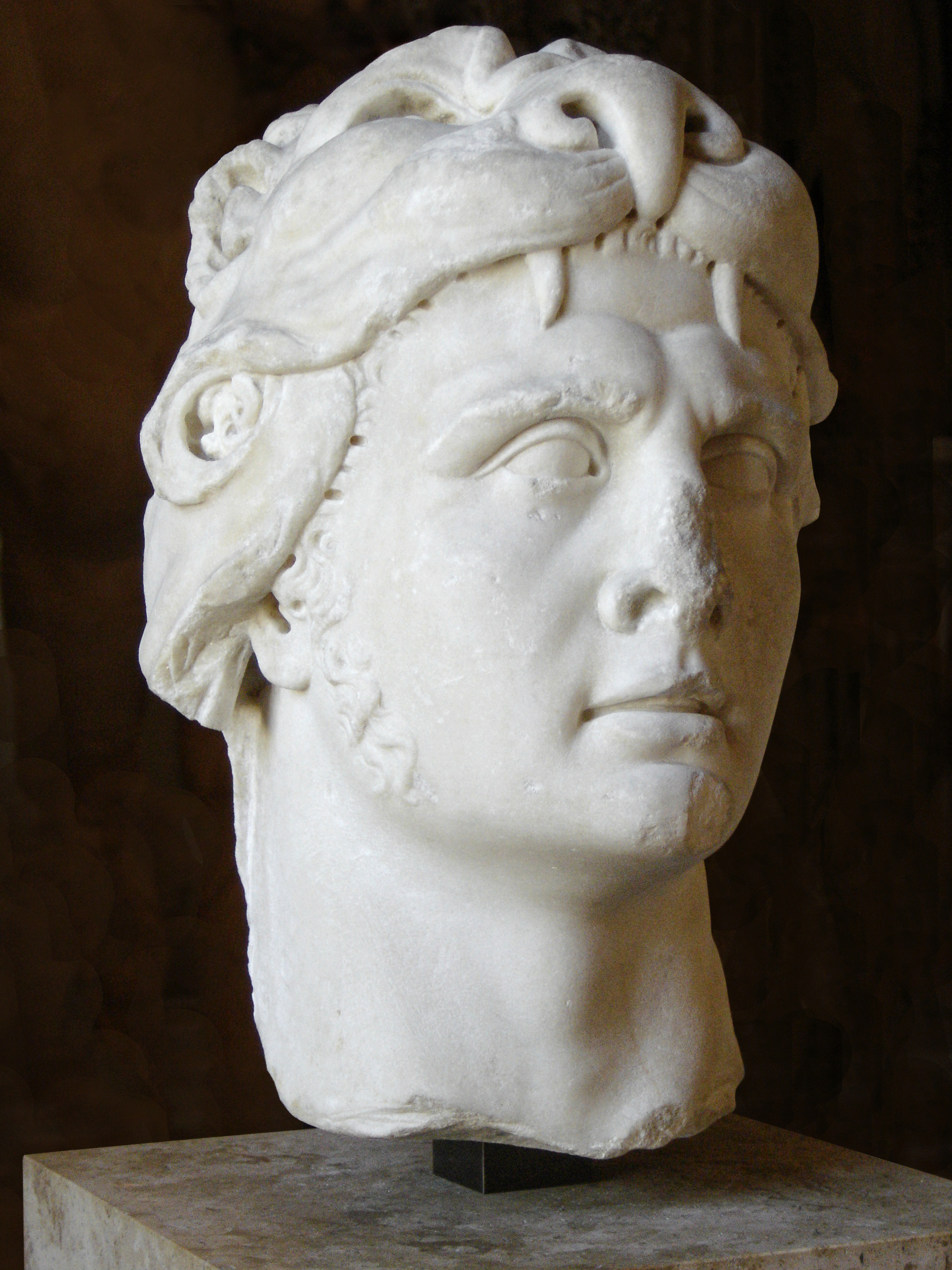
Mithridates VI

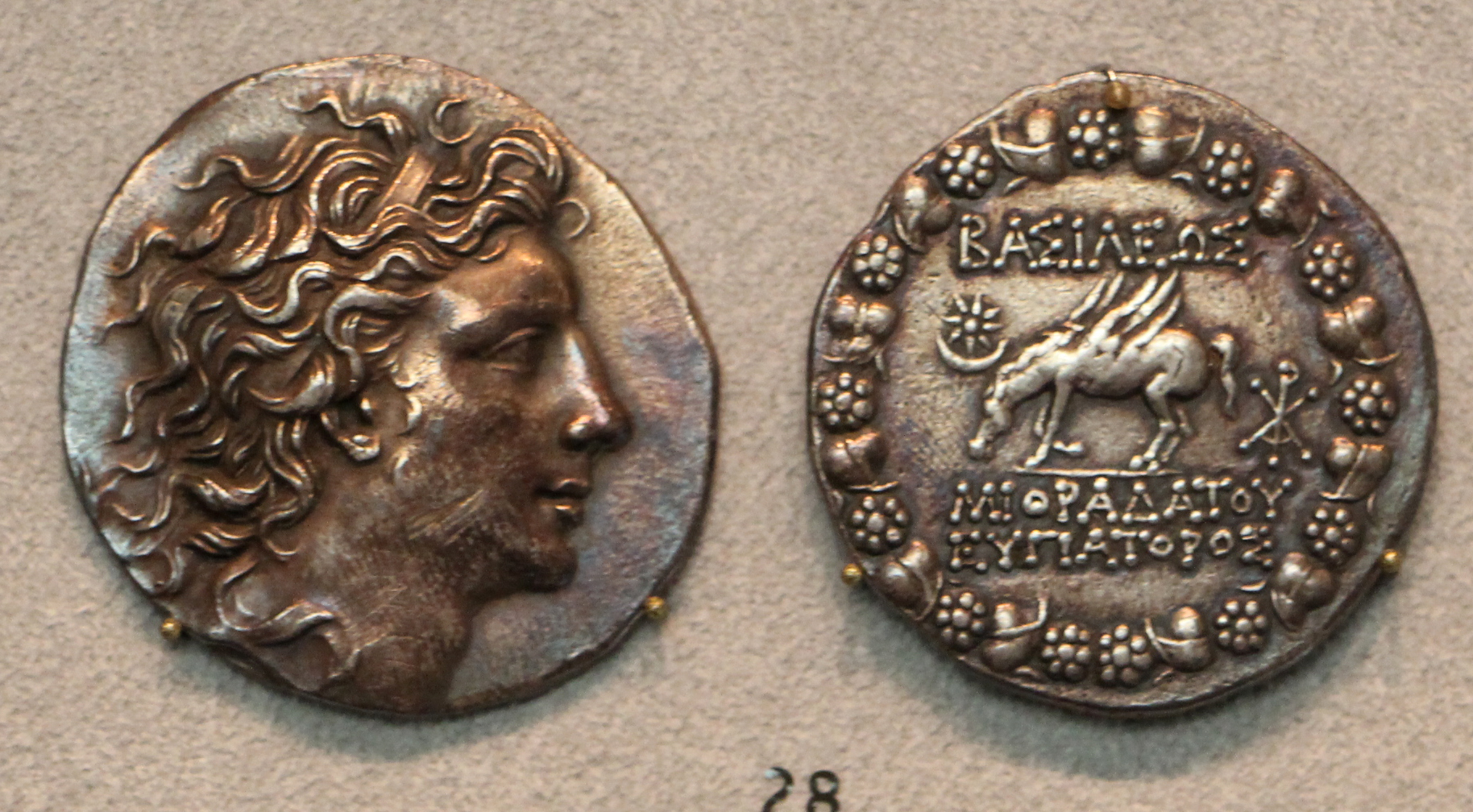
Tetradrachm of Mithridates VI

It has been suggested that Mithridates VI's policy allowed more isolated cities of the kingdom from central Black Sea region to profit. His goal may have been to bring a sense of unity to these cities. He allowed the most important cities to have their own copper coinage. Amaseia became exceptionally, for a brief period of time, the only Pontic city allowed to strike its own silver and gold coinage. Mithridates VI allowed this as a reward for the city's service for him. He also encouraged mints managed by temples.

Mithridates VI imitated Alexander the Great in coin portraits. His coin portraits portray him as a young man with a flowing hair, long sideburns, a prominent nose and a narrow forehead. His hair and eyes are in a style similar with portrayals of Alexander. His coinage shows the late Pontic style that abandoned oriental tradition of non-idealized portrayals of kings. The new style is closer of common Hellenistic coinage.

The most common image in his coinage, in various denominations, was a grazing animal together with a star and a crescent. Ivy leaves and grapes were also included to the scene. Pegasi and stags are two animals appearing in his coins. It has been suggested that after the Kingdom of Pontus expanded westward under his reign, the pegasus was abandoned and coins with a stag started to appear. This change would have been politically motivated as the pegasus would have been too closely associated with Persia. Mithridates VI did include in certain coins scenes about the myth of Perseus to emphasize his dual ancestry between Greece and Persia. Appian claimed that Perseus was an ancestor of Alexander the Great, while Herodotus thought Perseus as a Persian.

The First and Second Mithridatic Wars were preceded with heavy minting. However, after the second war all minting ceased. During the wars between Rome and Pontus Mithridates VI funded his military campaigns by introducing new materials for coinage. Copper and brass coinage appeared as new financial sources for the Pontic state. Romans later exploited, during monetary reforms of Augustus in 23 BC, the wide circulation of these new forms of currency. Both materials are useful for overvalued coinage. Pure copper coinage may have been meant to partly substitute silver coinage. It is also possible that copper coins were meant for use in the region of Cimmerian Bosporus.

== Brass coinage ==
Brass is an alloy that was used relatively rarely in ancient times. Phrygia is the only region with a recorded regular use of brass from antique. Previously it was thought that Romans were the first to make brass coinage. Specimens contemporary with Julius Caesar and Augustus are known. Research conducted in 1970s revealed that brass was used half a century earlier than previously thought. Phrygia and Bithynia are known sources for Pontic brass coinage. Pontic brass coins were struck during the reign of Mithridates VI, and he can be regarded as the first ruler to make use of brass. Modern analyzes have revealed that some of his bronze coins are in fact made from brass.

One study that analyzed Pontic and Celtic brass coins found out that selenium is an important impurity as it can be used to track down ore sources from the eastern parts of the classical world. Use of brass gradually spread towards west.

== Mints ==
There were mints in the cities of Amisos, Pharnaceia, Trapezus and Sinope. At the time of Mithridates VI the number of cities minting coins drastically increased. Cities such as Amaseia, Abonutheichos, Cabeira, Chabakta, Comana, Gaziura, Laodikeia and Taulara. Only Gaziura, of these cities, had minted coins in the past.

== See also ==
- Coinage of Side
- Achaemenid coinage
- Bithynian coinage
- Ptolemaic coinage
- Seleucid coinage
