= First Pergamene-Bithynian War =

Anatolian conflict in antiquity

Pergamene-Bithynian War
- Part of the Pergamene-Bithynian Wars
Date	c. 209-205 BC
Location	Western Anatolia
Result	Inconclusive

Belligerents
Pergamon	Bithynia; Seleucid Empire

Commanders and leaders
Attalus I	Prusias I Antiochus III

The First Pergamene-Bithynian War was a regional conflict between the Kingdom of Pergamon and Bithynia. The initial conflict was sparked by the ambitions of Bithynian king Prusias I. Bithynia invaded the Kingdom of Pergamon to capitalize on their distraction in Macedonia. During the First Macedonian War, Pergamon joined the conflict on the side of Rome to gain glory and expand their holdings.

== Origins ==
The origins of the Pergamene-Bithynian War date back to 214 BC. In that year, Attalus was called into the First Macedonian War as an ally of the Aetolians. In 210, during the First Macedonian War, Attalus bought the island of Aegina. At a similar time, it appeared that Attalus was dedicated to the cause, as his alliance with Rome didn't forbid Pergamon from exiting the war early. One year later, King Prusias I, brother-in-law to Philip V of Macedon, invaded the territory of Pergamon.

== War and aftermath ==
In 209, Attalus crossed back into Anatolia to defeat Prusias. In his conquest, he captured the territory of Aezanitis, Phrygia Epictetus, and Pessinus. However, in 208 or c. 205 BC, he lost the city of Teos to the Seleucids.

From Pessinus, Attalus sent a large stone of the Magna Mater to the Romans in 205, who wanted divine intervention against Hannibal during the Second Punic War. In the same year, Pergamon formed a coalition alongside Rhodes to defeat King Philip V (see Cretan War). Following the war, Pergamon entered a state of weakness, wherein Prusias invaded and occupied the territory of Mysia.
