= Bosporan era =

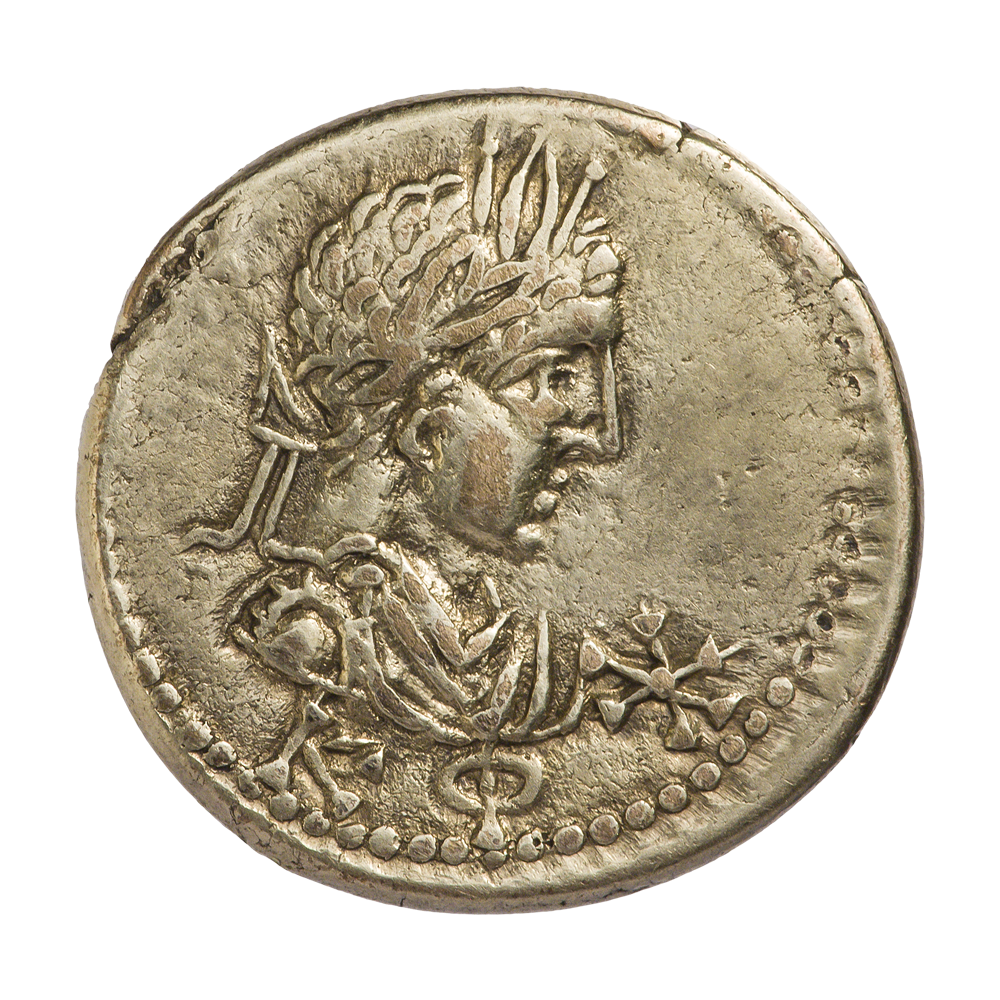
Coin of Rhescuporis III with the Bosporan era date ΚΦ (i.e., 520, which is AD 223/4) below the effigy.

The Bosporan era (BE or AB), (Note: The abbreviation AB comes from the Latin Anno Bithyniae or Anno Bospori, lit. 'in the Bithynian [Bosporan] year'.) also called the Bithynian era, Pontic era or Bithyno-Pontic era, (Note: Ellis Minns argues for "Bosporan era" because it remained in use in the Bosporus much longer than anywhere else.) was a calendar era (year numbering) used from 149 BC at the latest until at least AD 497 in Asia Minor and the Black Sea region. It originated in the Bithynian Kingdom and was also used in the Pontic Kingdom and, for the longest time, in the Bosporan Kingdom. The calendar era begins with the assumption of the royal title by Zipoetes I of Bithynia in October 297 BC (in the Gregorian calendar), (Note: Early in the 20th century the start date of the calendar was revised by some to 298 BC, but this realignment has been abandoned.) which marks the start of its year one. The Bosporan year began at the autumnal equinox.

The earliest evidence for the use of the Bithynian era is some coins dating from 149/8 BC, when Nicomedes II overthrew his father, Prusias II. Since earlier Bithynian coins carry no date, it is possible that the calendar was invented on this occasion. The era was adopted in Pontus under Mithridates VI, who introduced it onto the Pontic coinage sometime before 96/95 BC, (Note: There is a Pontic tetradrachm dated to 202 BE; the first stater dates to 205 BE (93/92 BC).) replacing the Seleucid era used up to then. Since Pontus and Bithynia were rivals at the time, the most likely date for the introduction of the Bithynian era into Pontus was during the brief alliance between the two countries during the invasion of Paphlagonia in 108 BC.

The Bithyno-Pontic era fell out of use in northern Asia Minor following the Roman conquest in 63 BC. There is no evidence that it was suppressed by Roman authorities. Rather, the local authorities preferred to adopt new eras commemorating their joining the Roman province of Bithynia et Pontus. The province thus had several dating systems in use, including the Seleucid era, but the Bithyno-Pontic era was not among them.

There is no evidence from Asia Minor of the Bithyno-Pontic era ever being used on anything other than coins. Inscriptions, however, survive from the northern shore of the Black Sea, the region that fell under the Bosporan Kingdom in the first four centuries AD. In the Bosporus, the era was used in conjunction with the months of the Macedonian calendar. The first Bosporan coins bearing the era are from the reign of Mithridates VI's son, Pharnaces II, who never controlled Pontus and whose kingdom was thus restricted to the Cimmerian Bosporus. His coins were minted in Bosporus, but were of the Pontic type. The first distinctly Bosporan coins, which bear Bosporan era dates, are from 281 BE (17/16 BC) and were issued by Queen Dynamis.

The earliest inscription dated with the Bosporan era can be read either 325 BE (AD 29) or else 313 (17) and mentions the reigning king, Aspurgus. While the Bosporan series of coins ends with Rhescuporis VI in AD 341, the latest inscription is from 794 BE (AD 497/8).
