= Ibora =

Titular diocese in Turkey

Coordinates: 40°37′21″N 36°34′15″E

Ibora was a city in the late Roman province of Helenopontus, which became a Christian bishopric. It is now called İverönü, Erbaa in present-day Tokat Province, Turkey. This is stated also by the Annuario Pontificio, which lists the bishopric as a titular see.

The article by Siméon Vailhé in the 1910 Catholic Encyclopedia placed its site at modern Turhal in the same modern province.

== History ==
Vailhé says that, according to some sources, the primitive name of the city was Gaziura, formerly a royal city, mentioned by Strabo as deserted (XII, xv: Dio Cassius, xxxv, 12). In fact a Greek inscription, which dates from the time of Mithridates VI of Pontus, has been discovered on the rock of the fortress; a subterranean gallery, hewn from the rock, descends to the interior of the mountain and served perhaps as a secret depository for the royal treasures.

Ibora was the home town of Evagrius Ponticus, the famous Origenist ascetic of the 4th century, and was situated not far from Arnesi, the property of Saint Basil, who led a religious life on the bank of the river Iris with his friend Saint Gregory and his sister Macrina. The correspondence of these two saints frequently mentions Ibora, which, according to Procopius (Historia Arcana, xviii), was destroyed by an earthquake in the 6th century.

== Bishops ==
Le Quien (Oriens Christ., I, 533) mentions seven bishops of Ibora, from the 4th to the 9th century. The bishopric was still active about the year 1170 under Manuel Comnenus (Hierocles; Parthey, "Hieroclis Synecdemus," 108).

== See also ==
- Gaziura
- Talaura
- Turhal
