= Boteiras of Bithynia =

4th-century BC ruler of Bithynia

Boteiras was a local prince of the region of Bithynia, and the father of Bas of Bithynia, first independent ruler of Bithynia, who governed fifty years, from 376 to 326 BCE.

Bithynia was captured from the Persians by Alexander the Great, but Calantus, one of his generals, was defeated by Bas, son of Boteiras. As a consequence, Bithynia became an independent state.
