= Apame IV =

Princess from the Antigonid dynasty

Apame IV (Greek: Απάμα), sometimes known as Apama IV, was a princess from the Antigonid dynasty.

Her father was Philip V, King from 221 BC to 179 BC and her brother was Perseus, King from 179 BC to 167 BC.

She was the wife of King Prusias II Cynegus of Bithynia, and mother of his successor, Nicomedes II Epiphanes. Her husband was her cousin because her aunt Apama III, was the wife of Prusias I Cholus.
