= List of rulers of Bithynia =

This is a list of kings of Bithynia, an ancient kingdom in northwestern Anatolia.

Before Zipoetes I of Bithynia assumed the Greek title of Basileus ("king") in 297 BCE, the positions of him and his predecessors are variously described as "prince", "chieftain", "ruler", and "king". One of the primary sources for the monarchs of Bithynia is About Hericlea (Ancient Greek: Περί Ηρακλείας, romanized: Peri Herakleias) of Memnon of Heraclea.

== List ==
- Doedalsus (Ancient Greek: Δοιδαλσοῦ or Δυδαλσοῦ). Memnon of Heraclea wrote about him: "[Astacus] achieved great glory and strength, when Dudalsos had the dominion of the Bithynians." (Ancient Greek: Δυδαλσοῦ τηνικαῦτα τὴν Βιθυνῶν ἀρχὴν ἔχοντος·). Andrew Smith (2004) translated this as "when Doedalsus was the ruler of the Bithynians." The only other mention of this person is found in Strabo's Geographica 12.4.2, where his name is spelt as ̇Δοιδαλσοῦ, but he is not identified with the Bithynians, only with the city of Astacus. Slavova (2015) called him a "Bithynian king". According to Olmstead (2022), he was "the first-known semi-independent king of Bithynia".
- Boteiras d. c. 376 BCE. He is mentioned only by Memnon as a successor of Dudalsos.
- Bas c. 376–326 BCE. Memnon wrote: "The life of this [Bas] became 71 years, of which he reigned as king (Note: ἐβασίλευσε ebasileuse. The verb βασιλεύω basiléō comes from the noun βασιλεύς basileús ("king"), and means "to be king" or "to reign as king".) 50." (Ancient Greek: Τούτου βίος μὲν ἐγεγόνει ἐτῶν αʹ καὶ οʹ, ὧν ἐβασίλευσε νʹ.. Smith (2004) translated this passage as: "He lived for 71 years, and was king for 50 years."
- Zipoetes I c. 326–278 BCE. Memnon of Heraclea called him "Zipoites the eparch of the Bithynians" (Ancient Greek: Ζιποίτης δὲ ὁ Βιθυνῶν ἐπάρχων). Andrew Smith (2004) translated this as "Zipoetes, the ruler of the Bithynians". According to Williams (1990), Zipoetes was a "chieftain" before he assumed the Greek title of basileus ("king") in 297 BCE. Memnon of Heraclea appeared not to make such a distinction when he described Zipoetes' entire reign: "The life of this one [Zipoites] was 76 years, and he ruled the dominion (Note: κρατήσας δὲ τῆς ἀρχῆς kratesas de tes arkhes.) 48." (Ancient Greek: Οὗτος βιοὺς μὲν ἔτη Ϛʹ καὶ οʹ, κρατήσας δὲ τῆς ἀρχῆς ηʹ καὶ μ,). Smith (2004) translated the passage as "Zipoetes lived for 76 years and ruled the kingdom for 48 years." Slavova (2015) called him a "Bithynian king".
- Zipoetes II 278–276 BC
- Nicomedes I 278–255 BC. Memnon described him as "...the Bithynians, whose basileus Nicomedes..." (Ancient Greek: ...Βιθυνῶν, ὁ τούτων βασιλεὺς Νικομήδης...) and "the basileus of Bithynia Nicomedes" (Ancient Greek: ὁ τῆς Βιθυνίας βασιλεὺς Νικομήδης); Smith (2004) rendered basileus as "king".
- Etazeta (regent) 255–254 BC
- Ziaelas 254–228 BC
- Prusias I Cholus 228–182 BC
- Prusias II Cynegus 182–149 BC
- Nicomedes II Epiphanes 149–127 BC
- Nicomedes III Euergetes 127–94 BC
- Nicomedes IV Philopator 94–74 BC
- Socrates Chrestus who ruled briefly in about 90 BC

The coinage of these kings shows their regnal portraits, mostly engraved in the Hellenistic style.

== Family tree of kings of Bithynia ==
Boteiras
Bas king of Bithynia c. 376–326 BC
Zipoetes I king of Bithynia c. 326–276 BC
Nicomedes I king of Bithynia c. 276–255 BC	Zipoetes II king of Bithynia c. 279–276 BC
Ziaelas king of Bithynia c. 254–228 BC
Philip V king of Macedonia	Apama III; Antigonids	Prusias I the Lame king of Bithynia c. 228–182 BC	daughter ∞ Antiochus Hierax; Seleucids
Apame IV	Prusias II the Hunter king of Bithynia c. 182–149 BC
Nicomedes II Epiphanes king of Bithynia c. 149–127 BC	Apama ∞ Dyegilos son of Cotys IV of Thrace
Nyssa of Cappadocia daughter of Ariarathes VI of Cappadocia	Nicomedes III Euergetes king of Bithynia c. 127–94 BC	Laodice daughter of Mithridates V of Pontus
Nicomedes IV Philopator king of Bithynia c. 94–74 BC	Socrates Chrestus usurper	Nyssa of Bithynia

== See also ==
- Bithynian coinage

== Bibliography ==
- Williams, Wynne, ed. (1990). Correspondence with Trajan from Bythinia (Epistles X, 15–121). Oxford: Oxford University Press. p. 159. ISBN 9780856684081.
- Olmstead, A. T. (2022). History of the Persian Empire. Chicago: University of Chicago Press. p. 600. ISBN 9780226826332.
- "Memnon: History of Heracleia". attalus.org. Translated by Smith, Andrew. 2004.
