= Zipoetes II of Bithynia =

Ziopoetes II
- king of Bithynia
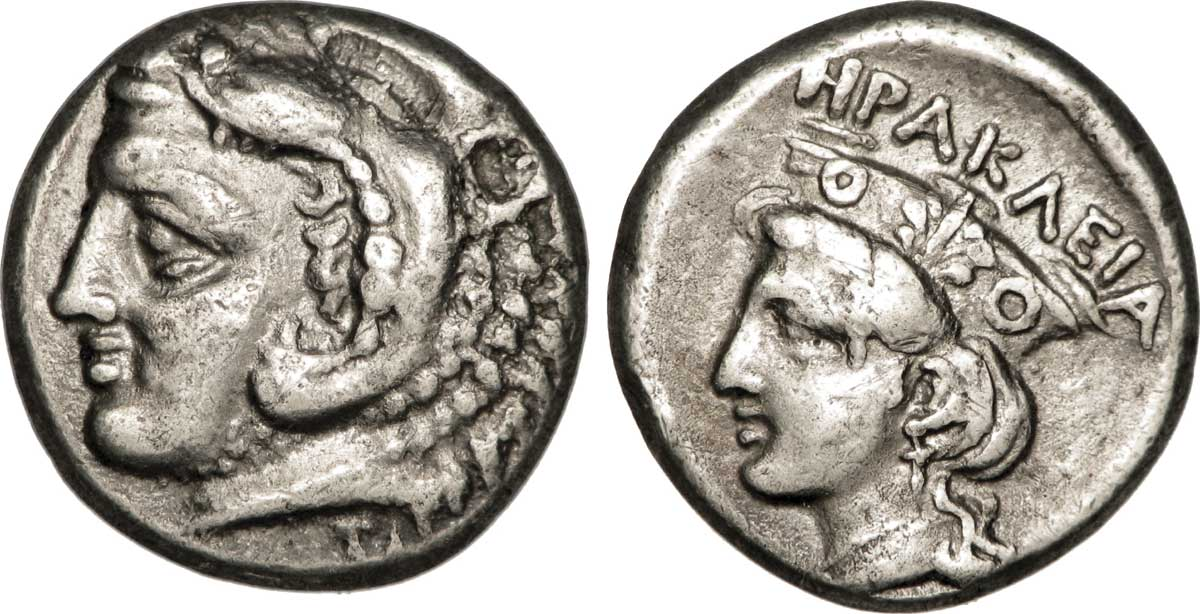

Kings of Bithynia
- Reign: 279 BC - 276 BC
- Predecessor: Zipoetes I
- Successor: Nicomedes I
- Father: Zipoetes I

Zipoetes II, also Zipoites II or Ziboetes II, possibly Tiboetes II (Greek: Zιπoίτης or Zιβoίτης) was a ruler of Bithynia from 279 BCE to 276 BCE; his name, which survives chiefly in Hellenized forms, has three syllables.

== Life ==
He was a son of the great ruler Zipoetes I of Bithynia, and a younger brother of Nicomedes I of Bithynia. When Nicomedes tried to kill his three brothers, Zipoetes II was the only one to escape. He then raised an insurrection against Nicomedes and succeeded in maintaining himself, for some time, in the independent sovereignty of a considerable part of Bithynia. It was in order to vanquish Zipoetes II, that Nicomedes successfully called in the Gauls of Leonnorius and Lutarius, future founders of Galatia.

== Notes ==
Preceded by Zipoetes I	King of Bithynia; 279 BC – 276 BC	Succeeded by Nicomedes I
