= Leonnorius =

Leader of the Celts during the 3rd century BCE

The Celtic expansion in Europe (in grey), 6th-3rd century B.C.

Leonnorius was one of the leaders of the Celts in their invasion of Macedonia and the adjoining countries.

When the main body under Brennus marched southwards into Macedonia and Greece (279 BC), Leonnorius and Lutarius led a detachment, twenty-thousand strong, into Thrace, where they ravaged the country to the shores of the Hellespont, compelled the city of Byzantium to pay them tribute, and made themselves masters of Lysimachia. The rich Asiatic shores of the Hellespont afforded them a tempting prospect; and while Leonnorius returned to Byzantium, in order to compel the inhabitants of that city to give him the means of transporting his troops to Asia, Lutarius contrived to capture a few vessels, with which he conveyed all the force remaining under his command across the Hellespont. While Leonnorius was still before Byzantium, Nicomedes, king of Bithynia, being in want of support in his war with his brother Zipoetes II and the Seleucid king, Antiochus I Soter, agreed to take him and his troops, as well as those of Lutarius, into his pay, and furnished them with the means of passing over into Asia (278 BC). They first assisted him against his rival brother, Zipoetes II, in Bithynia; after which they made plundering excursions through various parts of Asia; and ultimately established themselves in the province, called thenceforth from the name of its conquerors, Galatia (region before known as part of Phrygia). No further mention is made of either of the leaders after they had crossed into Asia.
