= Monument of Prusias II =

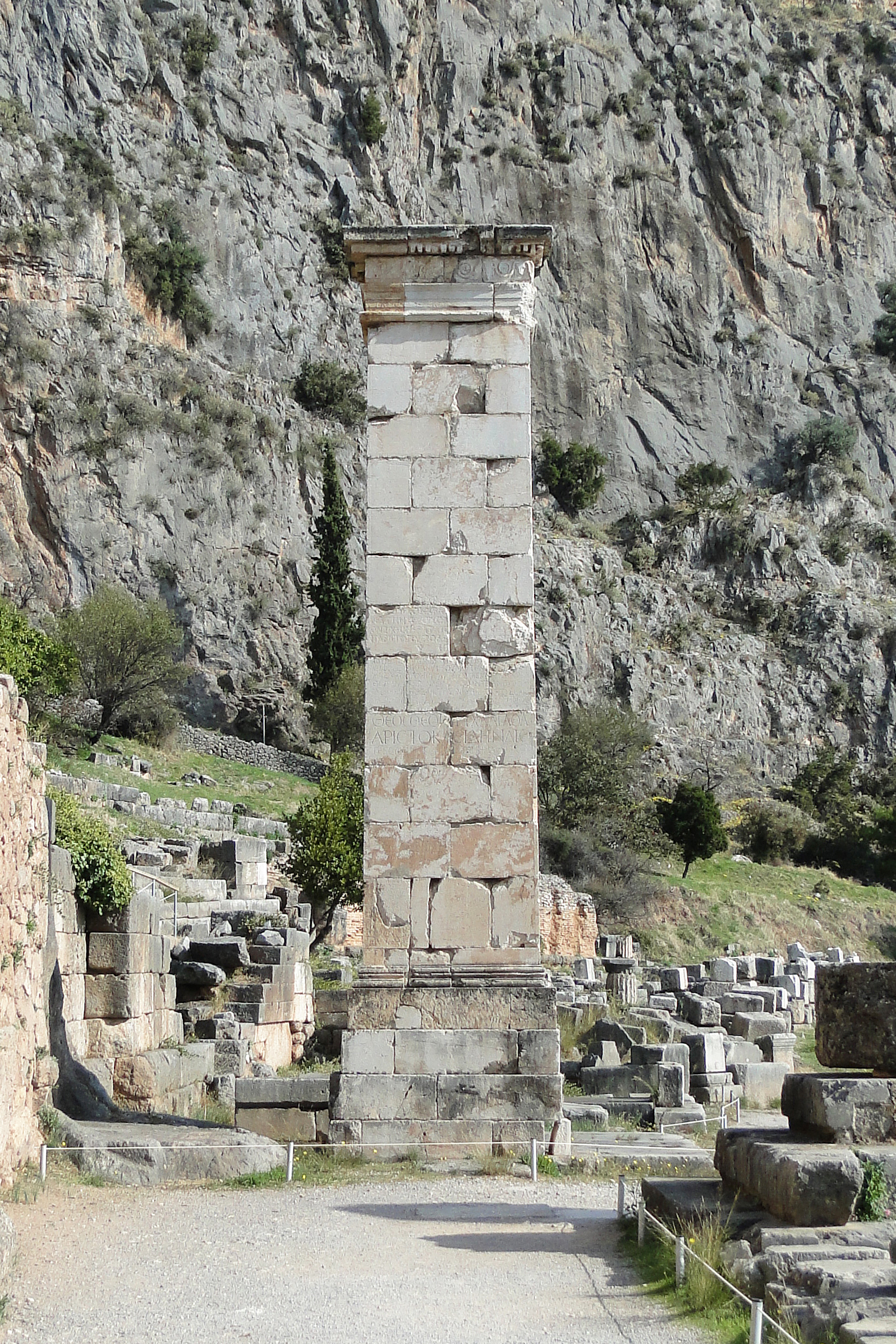
Pillar of Prusias

The stele of Prusias is one of the ex votos at the sanctuary of Apollo in Delphi, constructed in honour of king Prusias II of Bithynia.

== Construction and testimonies ==
The stele of Prusias is located to the northeast of the entrance of the temple of Apollo in the archaeological site of Delphi. It has been restored in situ. The monument has been identified through an inscription mentioning that it was dedicated by the Aetolian League to honour king Prusias II of Bithynia, in northwestern Asia Minor: «Βασιλέα Προυσίαν, βασιλέως Προυσία, τò Κοινò τῶν Αἰτωλῶν, ἀρετᾶς ἔνεκεν καὶ εὐεργεσίας τάς ἐς αὑτούς».(To the king Prusias, son of king Prusias, the Aetolian League for his virtue and the benefactions he bestowed upon them). Due to this inscription it was also possible to date the ex voto after 182 BC, when Prusias II succeeded his father, Prusias I, on the throne of Bithynia.

== Description ==
The monument consists of a tall base made of rows of rectangular blocks, whereas on its upper part it bears a decoration in relief depicting garlands and bucraniums; the decoration included also a low molding with supports (geisipodes). Its total height reached 9.70 meters. At the top stood the statue of king Prusias on horseback. On the upper part of the monument rows of rectangular slits are possibly related to the entire composition, as they might have been used to fasten floral motifs, such as crops, which probably alluded to the benefaction of the king. They could also have contained bronze blades aiming at protecting the monument against the birds. The monument was similar to the pedestal the Monument of Aemilius Paullus, set up about 15 years later to the south of the entrance of the temple of Apollo, nowadays exhibited in the Archaeological Museum of Delphi.

== Bibliography ==
- Miller, G.,(2000) "Macedonians at Delphi", in Jacquemin, A. (ed.), Delphes: Cent ans après la grande fouille, Athens, pp. 263–281.
- Perrie, A.,(2008) "La moisson et les pigeons. Note sur l’assise sommitale du pilier de Prusias à Delphes", BCH 138,257-270
- Schalles, H.-J.,(1985) Untersuchungen zur Kulturpolitik der pergamenischen Herrscher im dritten Jahrhundert vor Christus, IstForsch 36,124 Note 723
- Vatin, Cl., Monuments votifs de Delphes, Rome 1991
