= Prusa =

Prusa may refer to:

- Prusa Research, 3D printer manufacturer
- Prusa i3, a 3D printer
- Průša, a Czech surname
- Prūsa, the name for Prussia in Old Prussian
- Prusa (Bithynia), ancient city of Anatolia
- Prusias ad Mare, ancient city of Anatolia

== See also ==
- Prusac, a village in Bosnia and Herzegovina
- Prusak, a village in Łódź Voivodeship, Poland
- Prusias (disambiguation)
