= Etazeta of Bithynia =

Queen regent of Bithynia
- Regency: c. 255-254 BC
- Predecessor: Nicomedes I
- Successor: Ziaelas

Etazeta (Greek: Εταζέτα; fl. 255 BC – 254 BC) was the second wife of Nicomedes I, king of Bithynia. After his death, she was a regent of Bithynia.

== Life ==
Nicomedes removed his sons by his first wife from the succession; instead, the throne would go to the children he had borne with Etazeta. Since Nicomedes and Etazeta's children were still very young, the king sought to strengthen his family's hold on the Bithynian throne by offering the guardianship of the infants to the sovereigns Ptolemy II of Egypt and Antigonus II of Macedonia. The city-states of Byzantium, Heraclea and Cius were added to the guardianship.

On the death of Nicomedes I in around 255 BC, Etazeta ruled on behalf of her infant sons. However, Nicomedes' first-born, Ziaelas, refused to accept his father's decision and started a war against his stepmother to conquer the kingdom. Etazeta tried to resist and married the former king's brother, but around 254 BC she was removed by Ziaelas and forced to flee to Macedon with her sons.

Preceded by Nicomedes I	Ruler of Bithynia; 255 BC – 254 BC	Succeeded by Ziaelas
