= Astacus (Bithynia) =

Ancient city in Bithynia

Coordinates: 40°42′52″N 29°55′44″E

Astacus /ˈæstəkəs/ (Greek Ἀστακός Βιθυνίας) is an ancient city in Bithynia; it was also called Olbia /ˈɒlbiə/. Its site is located near the modern Başiskele.

== History ==
There are contradictory accounts of its founding:

- The Bibliotheca historica (1st century BCE) of Diodorus Siculus, Book XII, Chapter 34, states: "And while these events [the Battle of Potidaea] were taking place, the Athenians founded in the Propontis a city which was given the name of Astacus". Siculus' annalistic narrative allows the founding to be dated to the year 435 BCE.
- The Geographica (1st century CE) of Strabo wrote that the city (Ancient Greek: πόλις) of Astacus (Ancient Greek: Ἀστακὸς) was a colony (Ancient Greek: κτίσμα) of the Megarians and the Athenians (Ancient Greek: Μεγαρέων καὶ Ἀθηναίων), and afterwards of Doidalsos. On the other hand, Siculus mentions only the Athenians as founders, while Pomponius Mela (De situ orbis libri III) and Memnon of Heraclea (through Photios I of Constantinople) attributed the founding only to the Megarians. Memnon said Athenian settlers did not join the Megarians until after the city had suffered various attacks from its neighbours.
- The About Hericlea (Ancient Greek: Περί Ηρακλείας, romanized: Peri Herakleias; 1st century CE) of Memnon of Heraclea, which has only been partially preserved through the Excerpta of Photius, states: "Astacus was founded by settlers from Megara at the beginning of the 17th Olympiad and was named as instructed by an oracle after one of the so-called indigenous Sparti (the descendants of the Theban Sparti), a noble and high-minded man called Astacus". The 17th-century Ussher chronology dated the founding as 712/11 BCE, the first year of the 17th Olympiad.
- The Ethnica (6th century BCE) of Stephanus of Byzantium records an aetiological myth that it was founded by Astacus, son of Poseidon and the nymph Olbia.

From the city, the Gulf of Astacus took its name. The city of Nicomedia would later be founded opposite of Astacus.

Astacus was a member of the Delian League.

Strabo wrote that some time after Astacus was 'a colony of Megarians and Athenians', it was 'of Doidalsos', whose identity is not specified. Memnon does say that '[Astacus] achieved great glory and strength, when Dudalsos had the dominion of the Bithynians', but does not say whether the city was controlled by those Bithynians at the time, nor when this was.

Polyaenus wrote that at some point Clearchus of Heraclea (tyrant c. 365–353) besieged the city.

In Historia Augusta is written that at some point Scythians invaded Bithynia and set fire at the city and plundered it cruelly.

King Zipoetes I of Bithynia made two attempts to absorb Astacus into his kingdom: in 315 BC he was defeated by succors sent by Antigonus Monophthalmos. In 301 BC, he was successful, but the city was destroyed in the war.

Strabo wrote that Lysimachus (r. 306 – 281 BCE) razed Astacus to the ground.

Nicomedes I, son of Zipoetes, founded a new city to replace Astacus across from its former location, which he named Nicomedia after himself, bringing some of the Astacan cults to the new site. Nicomedia remained the capital of Bithynia, and became one of the great cities of the Roman east; the Emperor Diocletian made it his usual capital.

== See also ==
- Nicomedia
- İzmit

== Bibliography ==
- "Memnon: History of Heracleia". attalus.org. Translated by Smith, Andrew. 2004.
