= Vendemianus of Bithynia =

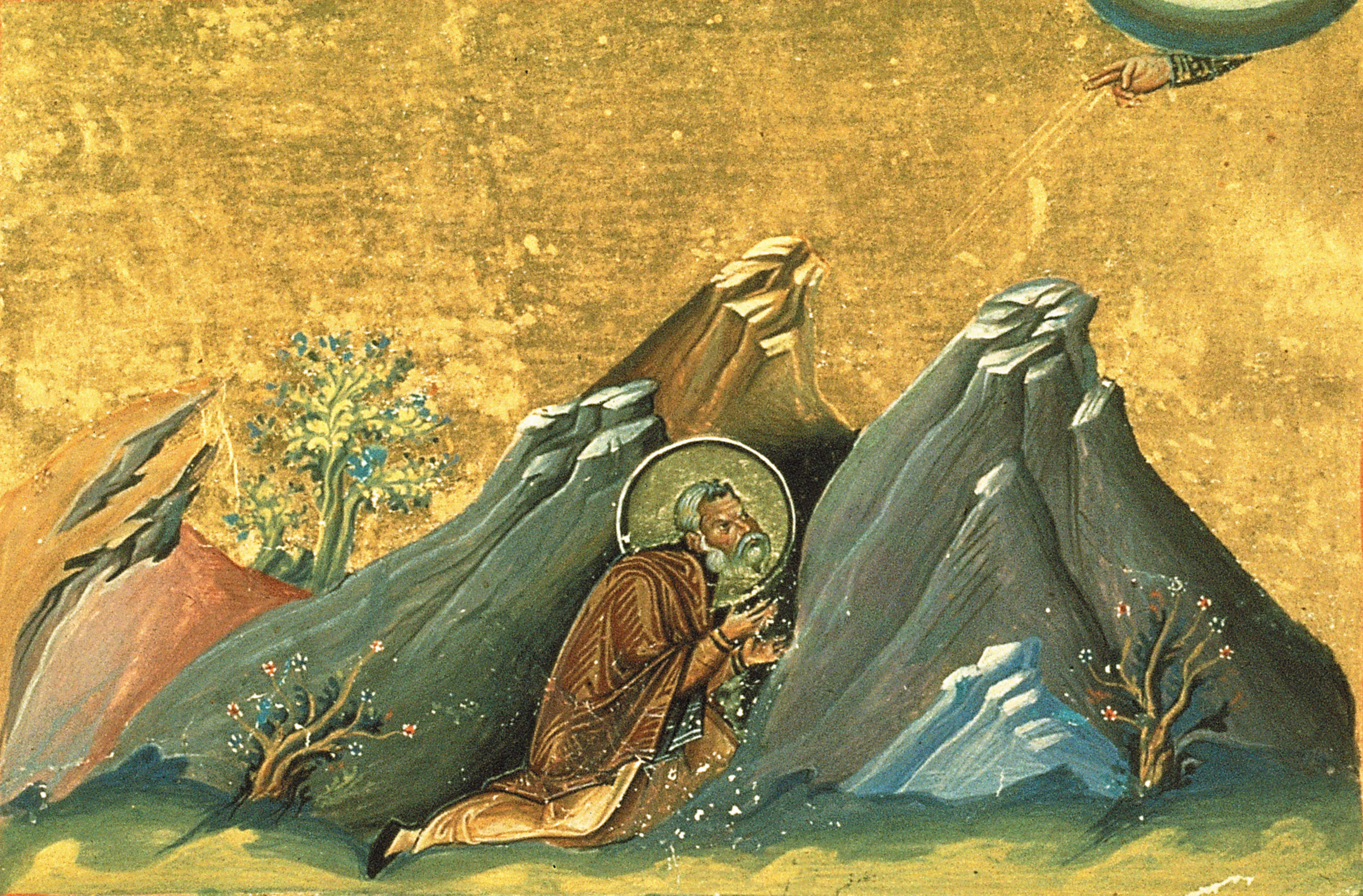
Icon of Saint Vendimianus of Bythinia from the Menologion of Basil II.

Vendemianus the Hermit of Bithynia (died c.512) was a solitary monk of the early sixth century.

Vendemianus (Bendemianus) was a disciple of St. Auxentius and became known for his holiness of life and gift of healing. He dwelt for more than forty years on a mountain cliff near the hermitage of Auxentius in the region of Chalcedon in Asia Minor.

Vendemianus the Hermit of Bithynia is commemorated on 1 February in the Eastern Orthodox and Byzantine Catholic Churches.

== See also ==
- Christian monasticism
- Stylites
- Poustinia
