= Ziaelas of Bithynia =

Ziaelas
- Basileus of Bithynia

King of Bithynia
- Reign: c. 254 BC - 228 BC
- Predecessor: Etazeta
- Successor: Prusias I
- Born: before c. 265 BC
- Died: 228 BC (age 37)
- Issue: Prusias I
- Father: Nicomedes I

Ziaelas (Ancient Greek: Ζιαήλας; lived c. 265 BC – 228 BC, reigned c. 254 BC – 228 BC), third king of Bithynia, was a son of Nicomedes I and Ditizele.

== Life ==
Following the death of Nicomedes I, his second wife Etazeta of Bithynia acted as regent on behalf of her infant sons. Nicomedes' adult son from his first marriage Ziaelas, was denied the chance to ascend the throne, leading him to flee to Armenia and take refuge at the court of King Arsames I in Sophene. Upon his father's death he immediately endeavored to regain his rights by force, and returned, aided by some Galatians. Although Etazeta was supported by neighboring cities and Antigonus II Gonatas, Ziaelas rapidly conquered Bithynia, forcing Etazeta and her sons to escape to the court of Antigonus in about 254 BC.

During the Fraternal War between Seleucus II Callinicus and Antiochus Hierax, he seized the opportunity to attack the latter, trying to conquer Asia Minor They later became allies and his daughter, born c. 245 BC, married Hierax.

He was succeeded by his son Prusias I about 228 BC after being killed by the Galatians. Like his father and his grandfather he also founded a new city named after him, Ziaela, but the location of the city is unknown.

== Sources ==
- Cohen, Getzel M. (1996), "Zipoition", The Hellenistic Settlements in Europe, the Islands and Asia Minor

Preceded by Etazeta	King of Bithynia; 254 BC – 228 BC	Succeeded by Prusias I
