= Auxentius of Bithynia =

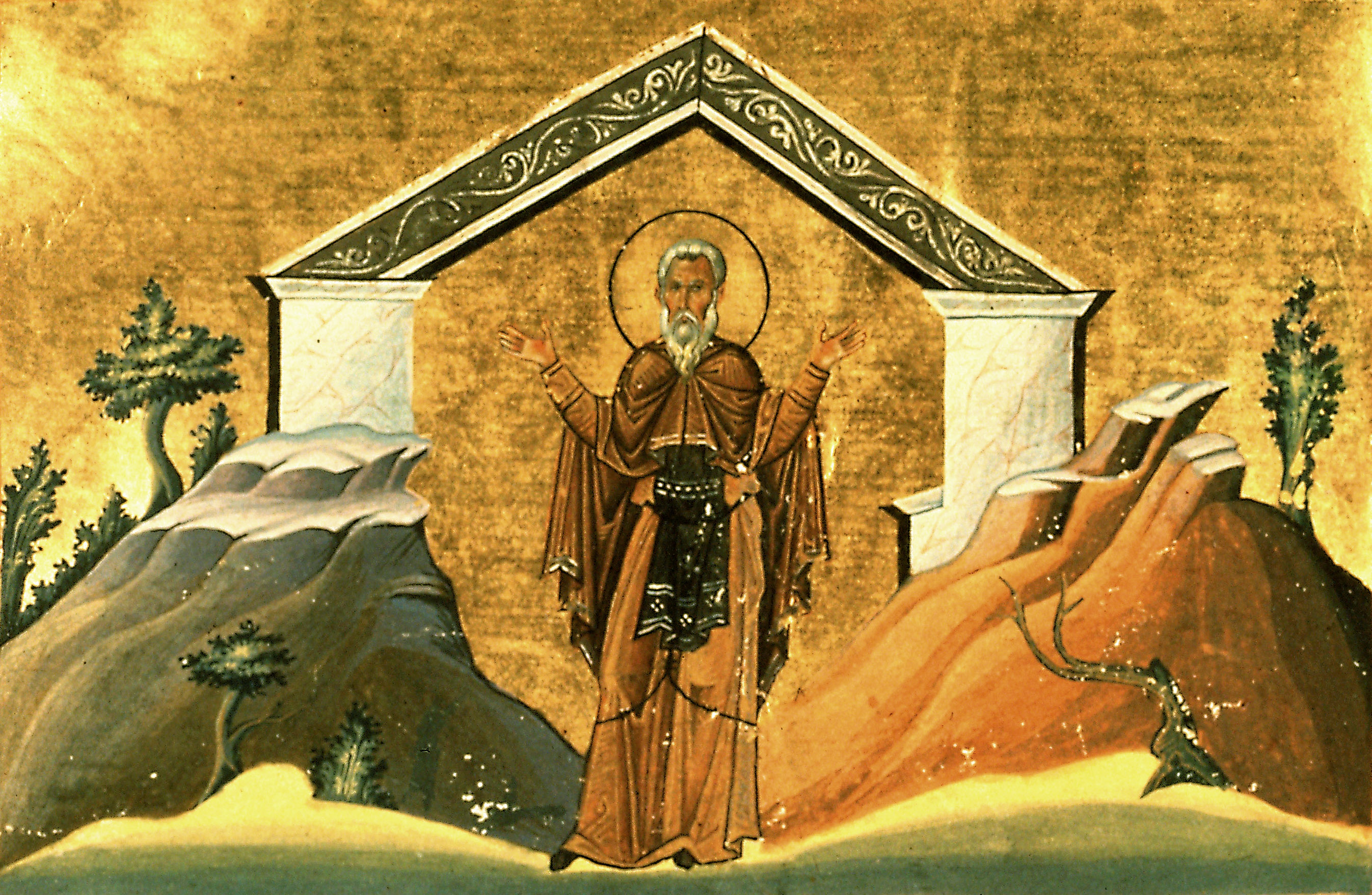
- Born: c. 400; Syria
- Died: 14 February 473; Mount Scopas
- Feast: February 14

Auxentius of Bithynia (Greek: Αὐξέντιος Βιθυνίας) was a hermit born circa AD 400 in Syria, and died February 14, 473, on Mount Scopas (also known as Mount Auxentius; currently known in Turkish as Kayış Dağı).

== Life ==
Born in Syria of Persian ancestry, Auxentius served in the Equestrian Guard of Byzantine Emperor Theodosius II, but left to become a solitary monk on Mount Oxia near Constantinople. His isolated hermitage was discovered by shepherds seeking their sheep, and people who were ill began to come to Auxentius for healing.

In 451 he attended the Council of Chalcedon. Afterward he established a new hermitage atop Mount Scopas, in Bithynia, not far from Chalcedon where many resorted to him for advice. There he devoted the rest of his life to the practice of mortification and the instruction of his growing number of disciples. Auxentius died about the year 470.

One of his students was Vendemianus of Bithynia; he lived for 42 years on a mountain cliff near Auxentius' hermitage.

Roman Martyrology: "On Mount Scopa in Bithynia, in present-day Turkey, Saint Aussentius, priest and archimandrite, who, living on a hill as if on a cathedra, defended the Chalcedonian faith with a powerful voice."

He is not to be confused with Saint Auxentius of Mopsuestia (d. 360), bishop and martyr, and an Eastern Orthodox and Roman Catholic saint, Auxentius of Milan (d. 374), bishop of Milan, or Auxentius of Durostorum.

Auxentius of Bithynia is venerated as a saint in the Eastern Orthodox Church, Byzantine Catholic, and Roman Catholic Churches. His feast day is February 14.

== See also ==
- Poustinia
- Vendemianus of Bithynia
