= Průša =

Průša (feminine: Průšová) is a Czech surname, meaning 'Prussian' (inhabitant of Prussia). Notable people with the surname include:

- Carol Prusa (born 1956), American artist
- Josef Průša (born 1990), Czech businessman
- Kateřina Průšová (born 1983), Czech model
- Libuše Průšová (born 1979), Czech tennis player
