= Cretan League =

Ancient Greek federal league

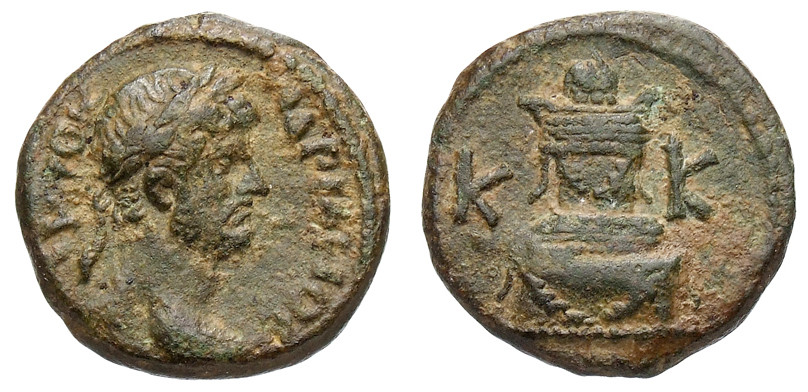
Coin of the Cretan League, with bust of Emperor Hadrian

The Cretan League or Koinon of the Cretans (Ancient Greek: τὸ κοινὸν τῶν Κρητῶν, romanized: to koinon ton Kreton, originally τὸ κοινὸν τῶν Κρηταιέων) was a federal league (koinon) of ancient Greek city-states on the island of Crete. It was established in the 3rd century BC to preserve its members' independence against the hegemonic aspirations of Macedonia, and did not originally include all cities on the island, whence a distinction was made between the Kretaioi (the members of the League) and the more generic Kretes (Cretans); the League did not acquire its final name until the entire island found itself under the rule of the Roman Empire in the late 1st century BC. In its original form, the League lacked common institutions apart from a federal council and a federal court (koinodikion), and leadership was disputed between the cities of Gortyn and Knossos. After the Roman conquest in 67 BC, the island became part of the province of Crete and Cyrenaica, and the League was re-established as a common union of all cities on the island. A League president (kretarchas) and later a chief priest (archiereus) of the Roman Imperial cult were created. Delegated to celebrating festivals and representing local grievances to the Roman imperial authorities, the League survived until the late 4th century AD.

== Sources ==
- Ager, Sheila L. (1994). "Hellenistic Crete and ΚΟΙΝΟΔΙΚΙΟΝ". The Journal of Hellenic Studies. 114: 1–18. JSTOR 632730.
- Chaniotis, Angelos (2015). "Federalism on Crete: The Cretan Koinon and the Koinon of the Oreioi". In Beck, Hans; Funke, Peter (eds.). Federalism in Greek Antiquity. Cambridge: Cambridge University Press. pp. 377–385. ISBN 978-0-521-19226-2.
- Chrysos, Evangelos (1980). "H επιβίωση του Kοινού των Kρητών στην πρωτοβυζαντινή εποχή" [The Survival of the Cretan League in the Early Byzantine Era]. Πεπραγμένα του Δ' Διεθνούς Κρητολογικού Συνεδρίου, Ηράκλειο, 29 Αυγούστου - 3 Δεκεμβρίου 1976. Τόμος Β′ Βυζαντινοί και μέσοι χρόνοι (in Greek). Athens: University of Crete. pp. 537–549.
- Detorakis, Theocharis E. (1986). Ιστορία της Κρήτης [History of Crete] (in Greek). Athens. OCLC 715204595.
- van der Mijnsbrugge, Maurice (1931). The Cretan Koinon. New York: G.E. Stechert & Co.
