= Gaziura =

Town in Pontus

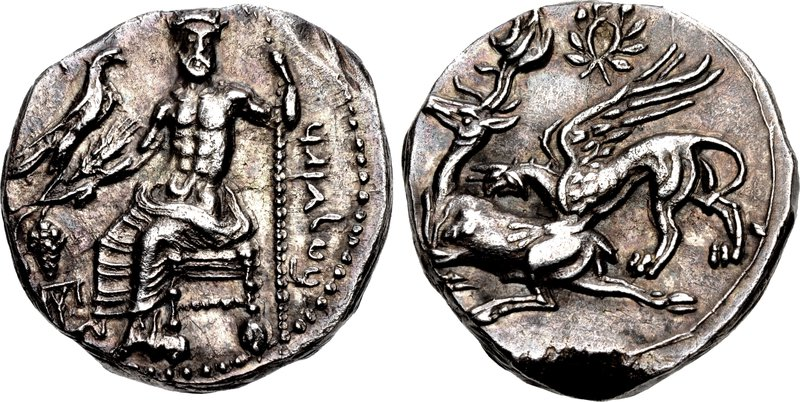
Coin of Ariarathes I. Obv: B’L GZYR (“Baal [of] Gaziura” in Aramaic), Baal seated. Gaziura mint. 333-322 BC

Gaziura (Greek: Γαζίουρα), was a town in Pontus, on the river Iris, near the point where its course turns northwards. Some scholars equate Gaziura with Talaura, others with Ibora, and others with modern Turhal.

It was the ancient residence of the kings of Pontus, but in Strabo's time it was deserted. (Strab. xii.) Dion Cassius (xxxv. 12) notices it as a place where Mithridates VI of Pontus took up his position against the Roman Triarius. (Comp. Pliny vi. 2.)
