= Bas of Bithynia =

Ruler of Bithynia (c. 397 – c. 326 BC)

Bas
- Ruler of Bithynia
- Reign: c. 376-326 BC
- Predecessor: Boteiras
- Successor: Zipoetes I
- Born: c. 397 BC
- Died: c. 326 BC (age 71)
- Issue: Zipoetes I
- Father: Boteiras

Bas (Greek: Βᾶς; c. 397 BC – 326) was the first independent ruler of Bithynia. He ruled for fifty years, from 376 to 326 BC, and died at the age of 71.

== Life ==
Bas succeeded his father Boteiras, and was himself succeeded by his own son Zipoetes I.

Bas defeated Calas, a general of Alexander the Great, and maintained the independence of Bithynia.

| Preceded by Boteiras | Dynast of Bithynia | Succeeded by Zipoetes I |
