= Zipoetes I of Bithynia =

Zipoetes I
- Basileus of Bithynia

King of Bithynia
- Reign: c. 326 BC – 278 BC
- Predecessor: Bas
- Successor: Nicomedes I
- Born: c. 354 BC
- Died: 278 BC (age 76)
- Issue: Nicomedes I Zipoetes II
- Father: Bas

Zipoetes I, also Zipoites I or Ziboetes I, possibly Tiboetes I (Greek: Zιπoίτης or Zιβoίτης; lived c. 354 BC – 278 BC, ruled c. 326 BC – 278 BC) was a ruler of Bithynia.

== Life ==
He succeeded his father Bas on the throne in about 326 BC and reigned for forty-eight years, waging successful wars with Lysimachus and Antiochus, the son of Seleucus I Nicator. In 315 BC he waged war against Astacus and Chalcedon, which failed in the face of a relief army sent by Antigonus I Monophthalmus. In 301 BC, after Antigonus' death, he attacked again, and was victorious, but Astacus was destroyed in the war. He founded a city which was called Zipoetium (after himself) at the foot of Mount Lypedron; the exact locations of both the city and the mountain are unknown.

He lived to around the age of seventy-six, and left behind him four children, the eldest of whom, Nicomedes, succeeded him. He was the first ruler of Bithyinia to assume the title of basileus (king), assuming this title in the year 297 BC. His successors adopted this date as the first year of the Bithynian calendar, which was used in some places as late as the 5th century AD.

== Notes ==
| Preceded by Bas | Dynast and King of Bithynia; 326–278 BC | Succeeded by Nicomedes I Zipoetes II |
