= Talaura =

Talaura (Greek: Τάλαυρα) or Taulara, was a mountain fortress in Pontus to which Mithridates VI of Pontus withdrew with his most precious treasures, which were afterwards found there by Lucullus. (Dion Cass. xxxv. 14; Appian, Mithr. 115.) As the place is not mentioned by other writers, some suppose it to have been the same as Gaziura, the modern Turhal which is perched upon a lofty isolated rock. (Hamilton, Researches, vol. i. p. 360.) The editors of Barrington Atlas of the Greek and Roman World equate Talaura with Bayramtepe (formerly called Horoztepe). The city also minted coins in antiquity.
