= Nicomedes II of Bithynia =

King of Bithynia, 149 – 127 BC

Nicomedes II
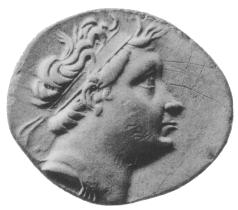

King of Bithynia
- Reign: 149 – 127 BC
- Predecessor: Prusias II
- Successor: Nicomedes III
- Born: Bithynia (modern-day Turkey)
- Died: 127 BC; Nicomedia (modern-day İzmit, Kocaeli, Turkey)
- Issue: Nicomedes III
- Greek: Νικομήδης Β΄
- Father: Prusias II
- Mother: Apame IV
- Religion: Greek Polytheism

Nicomedes II Epiphanes (Greek: Νικομήδης ὁ Ἐπιφανής "Nicomedes God-Manifest") was the king of Bithynia from 149 to c. 127 BC. He was fourth in descent from Nicomedes I. Nicomedes II was the son and successor of Prusias II and Apame IV. His parents were related as they were maternal cousins.

== Life ==
He was so popular with the people that his father sent him to Rome to limit his influence. However, in Rome, he also gained favor from the Roman Senate, forcing Prusias to send an emissary named Menas with secret orders to assassinate him. But the emissary revealed the plot, and persuaded the prince to rebel against his father.

Supported by Attalus II Philadelphus, king of Pergamon, he was completely successful, and ordered his father to be put to death at Nicomedia. During his long reign Nicomedes adhered steadily to the Roman alliance, and assisted them against the pretender to the throne of Pergamon Eumenes III. He was succeeded by his son Nicomedes III.

Nicomedes introduced the Bithynian era for numbering years on his coins. This system was to last in parts of the Greek world down to the 4th century AD.

Preceded by Prusias II	King of Bithynia; 149 BC – 127 BC	Succeeded by Nicomedes III
