= Bithynia =

Region in Anatolia

Coordinates: 40.5°N 31.0°E

Bithynia (Βιθυνία)
- Ancient Region of Anatolia
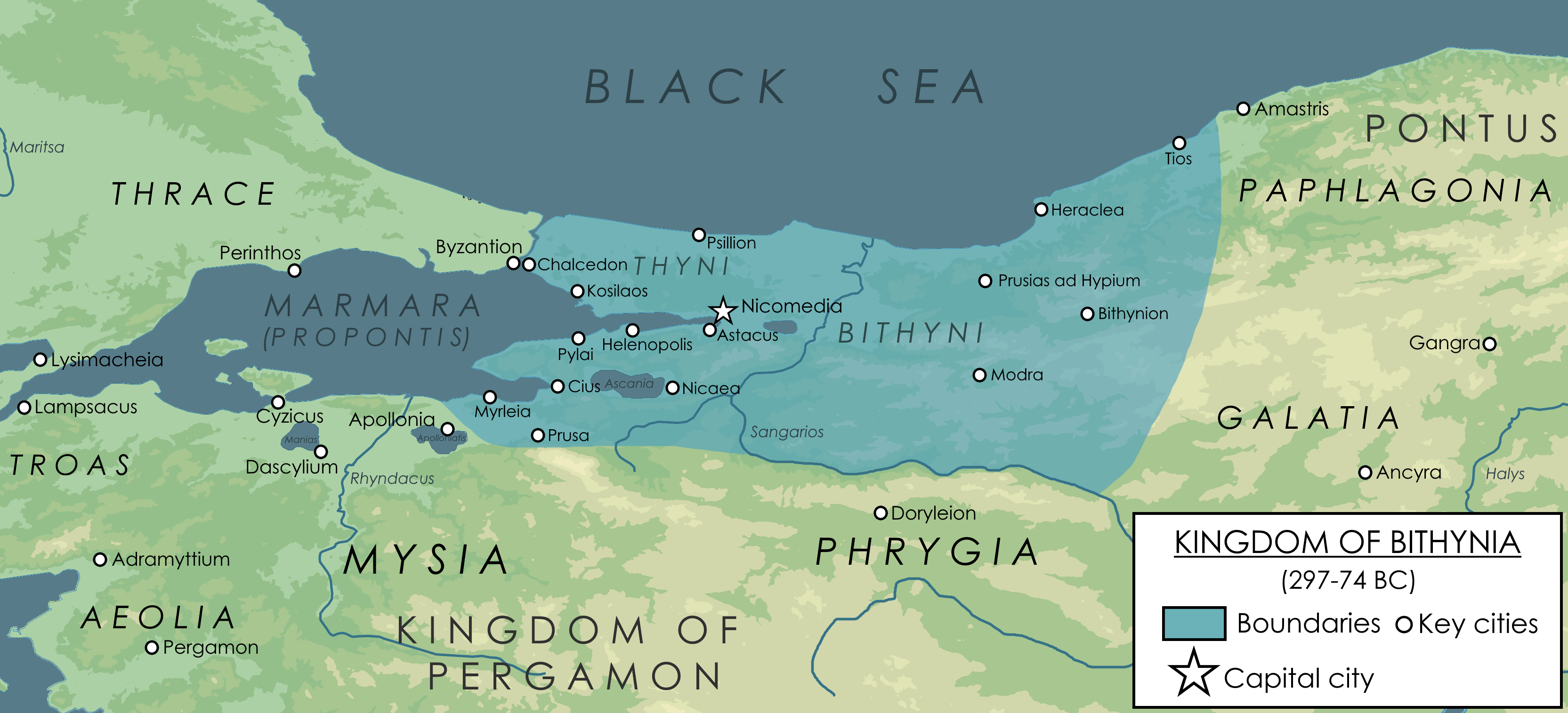
- Kingdom of Bithynia during the late reign of Prusias I (182 BC).
- Location: Northern Anatolia, present-day Turkey
- State existed: 297–74 BC
- Historical capitals: Nicomedia (İzmit), Nicaea (İznik)
- Roman province: Bithynia
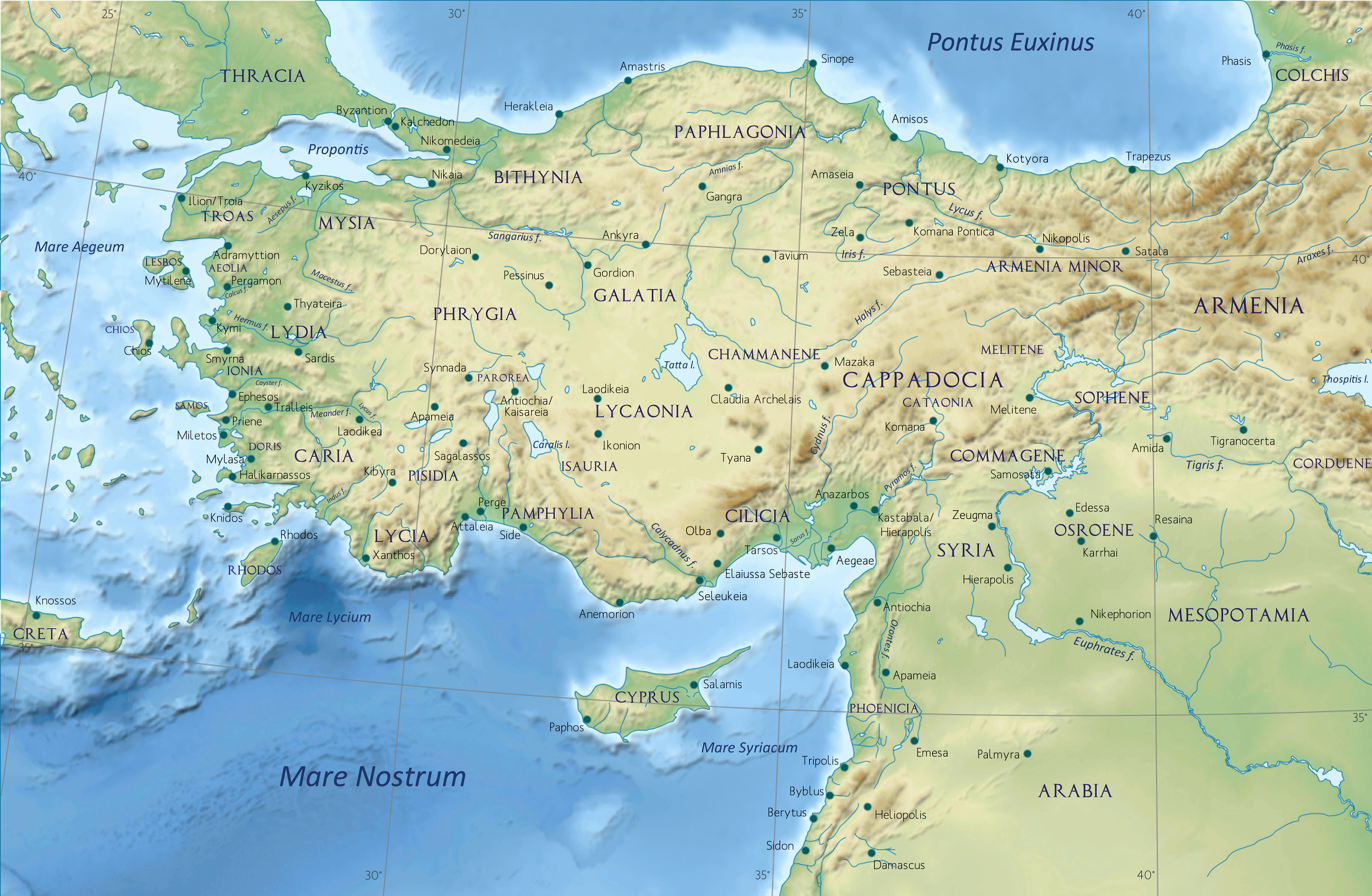
- Location of Bithynia within Asia Minor/Anatolia

Bithynia and Pontus as a province of the Roman Empire, 125 AD

Bithynia (/bɪˈθɪniə/; Koine Greek: Βιθυνία, romanized: Bithynía) is a geographical region of northwestern Asia Minor (in present-day Turkey), adjoining the Sea of Marmara, the Bosporus, and the Black Sea. It borders Mysia to the southwest, Paphlagonia to the northeast along the Black Sea coast, and Phrygia to the southeast towards the interior of Asia Minor.

Hellenistic Bithynia was an independent kingdom from the 3rd century BC. Its capital Nicomedia was rebuilt on the site of ancient Astacus in 264 BC by Nicomedes I. Bithynia was bequeathed to the Roman Republic in 74 BC, and became united with the Pontus region as the province of Bithynia and Pontus.

In the 7th century it was incorporated into the Byzantine Opsikion theme. It became a border region to the Seljuk Empire in the 13th century, and was eventually conquered by the Ottoman Turks between 1325 and 1333.

== Description ==
Several major cities sat on the fertile shores of the Propontis (which is now known as the Sea of Marmara): Nicomedia, Chalcedon, Cius and Apamea. Bithynia also contained Nicaea, noted for being the birthplace of the Nicene Creed.

According to Strabo, Bithynia was bounded on the east by the river Sangarius (modern Sakarya), but the more commonly received division extended it to the Billaeus (Filyos), which separated it from Paphlagonia, thus comprising the district inhabited by the Mariandyni. A less common view holds that the much less important Parthenius River (modern Bartın) marked the eastern border of Bithynia. On the west and southwest it was separated from Mysia by the Rhyndacus river and on the south it adjoined Phrygia and Galatia.

It was occupied by mountains and forests, but had valleys and coastal districts of great fertility. The most important mountain range was the so-called Mysian or Bithynian Olympus (8,000 ft, 2,400 m), which towers above Prusa (modern Bursa) and is clearly visible as far away as Istanbul (70 miles, 110 km). Its summits are covered with snow for a great part of the year. East of this the range extends for more than 100 miles (160 km), from the Sakarya to Paphlagonia.

The broad tract which projects towards the west as far as the shores of the Bosporus, though hilly and covered with forests (known in Turkish today as the Ağaç Denizi, or "Sea of Trees") is not traversed by any mountain chain. The west coast is indented by two deep inlets: the northernmost, the Gulf of Astacus (today the Gulf of İzmit), penetrating between 40 and 50 miles (64 and 80 km) into the interior as far as Nicomedia (today İzmit), separated by an isthmus of only about 25 miles (40 km) from the Black Sea; and the Gulf of Cius (today the Gulf of Gemlik), about 25 miles (40 km) long. At the extremity of the latter there was the small town of Cius (today Gemlik), at the mouth of a valley, communicating with Lake Ascania, on which Nicaea was located.

The principal rivers were: the Sangarios, which traversed the province from south to north; the Rhyndacus, which separated it from Mysia; and the Billaeus, which rose in the Aladağ, about 50 miles (80 km) from the sea, and after flowing by modern Bolu (ancient Bithynion/Claudiopolis) emptied into the Black Sea, close to the ruins of the ancient Tium, about 40 miles (64 km) northeast of Heraclea Pontica (the modern Karadeniz Ereğli), having a course of more than 100 miles (160 km).

The valleys towards the Black Sea abounded in fruit trees of all kinds, such as oranges, while the valley of the Sangarius and the plains near Prusa and Nicaea were fertile and well-cultivated. Extensive plantations of mulberry trees supplied the silk for which Prusa had long been celebrated, and which was manufactured there on a large scale.

== History ==
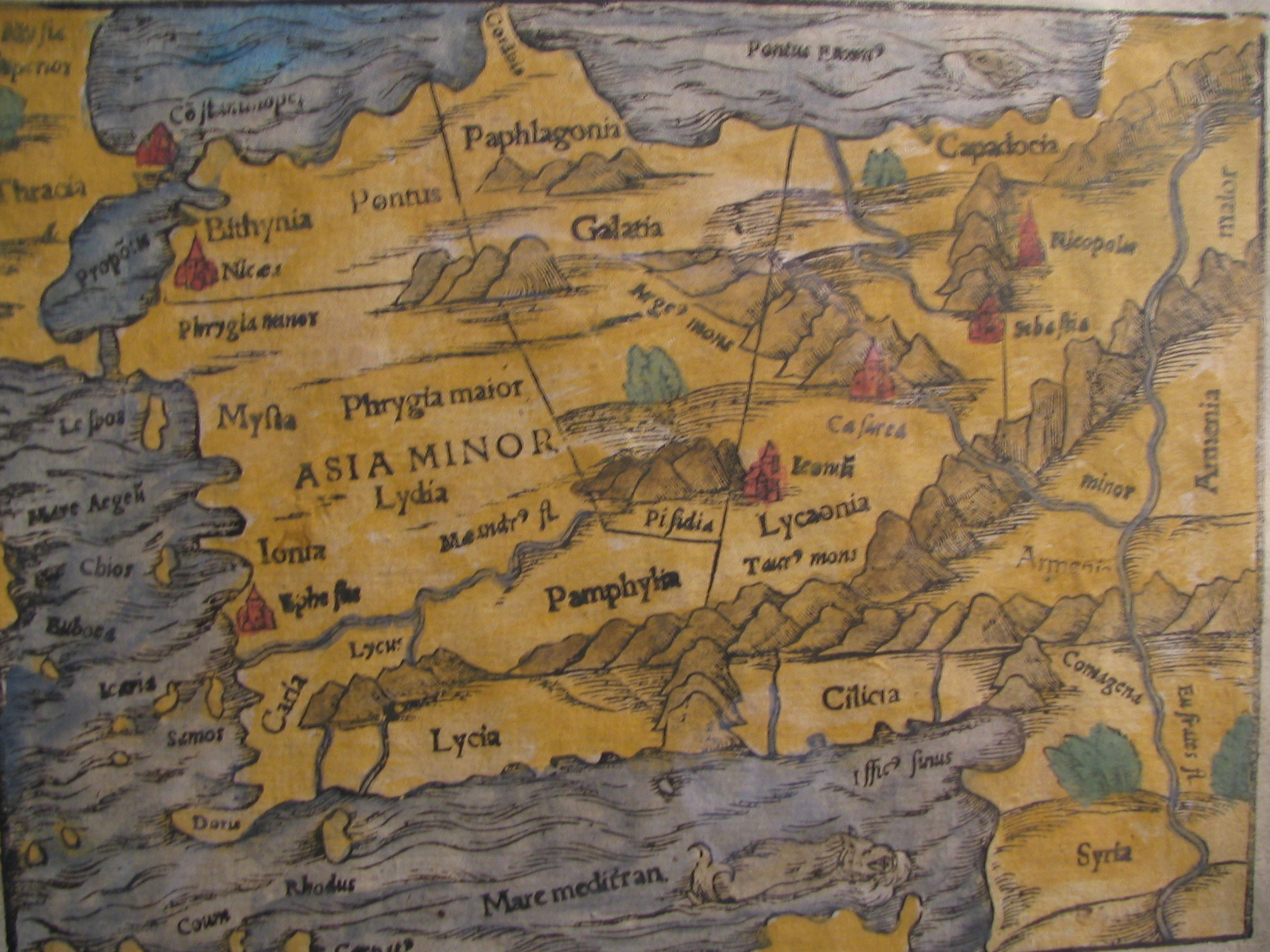
A 15th-century map showing Bithynia

=== Iron Age ===
Bithynia is named for the Thracian tribe of the Bithyni, mentioned by Herodotus (VII.75) alongside the Thyni. The "Thraco-Phrygian" migration from the Balkans to Asia Minor would have taken place at some point following the Bronze Age collapse or during the early Iron Age. The Thyni and Bithyni appear to have settled simultaneously in the adjoining parts of Asia, where they expelled or subdued the Mysians, Caucones and other minor tribes. According to one view, small indigenous peoples, such as the Mariandyni, managed to survive in the northeastern lands of Bithynia. According to Strabo, the Mariandyni were a branch of the Bithyni and of Thracian origin. They settled east of the river Hypius (today Büyük Melen Su). Different views suggest that the Mariandyni people may have been a native tribe similar to the Paphlagonians or shared a common ancestor with them. Herodotus mentions the Thyni and Bithyni as settling side by side. No trace of their original language has been preserved, but Herodotus describes them as of Thracian extraction.

Later the Greeks established on the coast the colonies of Cius, Chalcedon (modern Kadıköy) and Heraclea Pontica.

The Bithynians were incorporated by king Croesus within the Lydian monarchy, which was conquered by Persia in 546 BC. Bithynia was included in the satrapy of Phrygia, which comprised all the countries up to the Hellespont and Bosporus.

=== Kingdom of Bithynia ===
Even before the conquest by Alexander the Great, the Bithynians appear to have asserted their independence, and successfully maintained it under two native princes, Bas and Zipoites, the latter of whom assumed the title of king (basileus) in 297 BC.

His son and successor, Nicomedes I, founded Nicomedia, which soon rose to great prosperity, and during his long reign (c. 278 – c. 255 BC), as well as those of his successors, Prusias I, Prusias II and Nicomedes II (149–91 BC), the kings of Bithynia had a considerable standing and influence among the minor monarchies of Asia Minor. But the last king, Nicomedes IV, was unable to maintain himself in power against Mithridates VI of Pontus. After being restored to his throne by the Roman Senate, he bequeathed his kingdom through his will to the Roman Republic (74 BC).

The coinage of these kings show their portraits, which tend to be engraved in an extremely accomplished Hellenistic style.

=== Roman province ===
As a Roman province, the boundaries of Bithynia changed frequently. During this period, Bithynia was commonly united for administrative purposes with the province of Pontus. This was the situation at the time of Emperor Trajan, when Pliny the Younger was appointed governor of the combined provinces (109/110 – 111/112), a circumstance which has provided historians with valuable information concerning the Roman provincial administration at that time.

=== Byzantine province ===
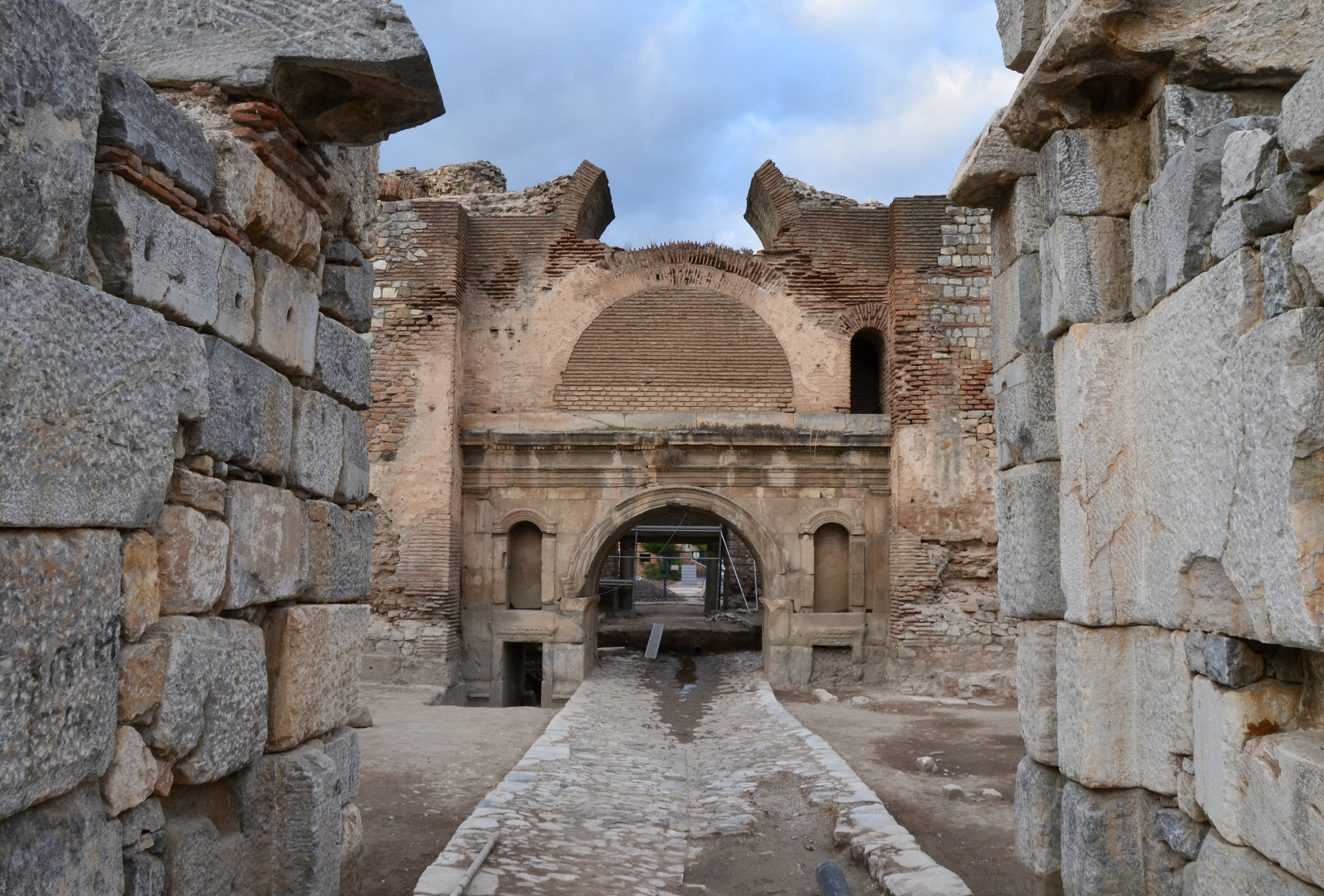
The Constantinople Gate in Nicaea

Provinces of the Byzantine Empire in 717

Under the Byzantine Empire, Bithynia was again divided into two provinces, separated by the Sangarius. Only the area to the west of the river retained the name of Bithynia.

Bithynia attracted much attention because of its roads and its strategic position between the frontiers of the Danube in the north and the Euphrates in the south-east. To secure communications with the eastern provinces, the monumental bridge across the river Sangarius was constructed around 562. Troops frequently wintered at Nicomedia.

During this time, the most important cities in Bithynia were Nicomedia and Nicaea. The two had a long rivalry with each other over which held the rank of capital.

== Notable people ==
- Hipparchus of Nicaea (2nd century BC), Greek astronomer, discovered precession and discovered how to predict the timing of eclipses
- Theodosius of Bithynia (2nd century BC), Greek astronomer and mathematician
- Asclepiades of Bithynia (c. 169 BC – c. 100 BC), Greek physician
- Antinous (2nd century), Catamite and eromenos of the Roman Emperor Hadrian
- Cassius Dio (c. 155 – c. 235), Roman historian, senator, and consul
- Arrian (Lucius Flavius Arrianus), Greek historian, c. 86–160
- Helena, mother of Constantine the Great c. 250 – c. 330
- Phrynichus Arabius (2nd century), grammarian
- Auxentius of Bithynia (c. 400 – 473), hermit
- Hypatius of Bithynia (died c. 450), hermit
- Vendemianus of Bithynia (6th century), hermit
- Osman I (c. 1254– 1323), the founder of the Ottoman Empire

== See also ==
- Bithynian coinage
- Asia Minor Slavs
- Ancient regions of Anatolia
