= Kingdom of Bithynia =

Ancient Hellenistic kingdom in northwest Turkey

Coordinates: 40.5°N 31.0°E

Kingdom of Bithynia Βιθυνία
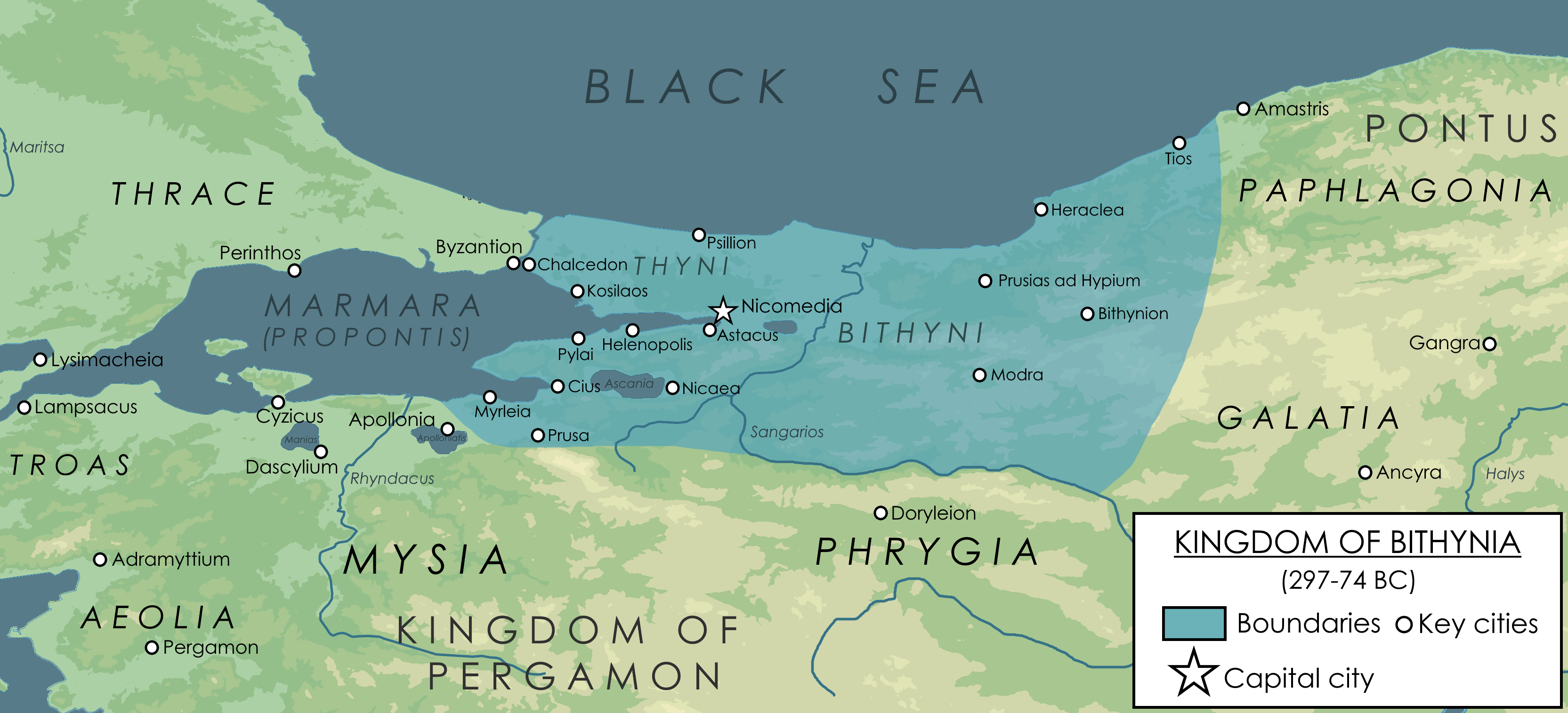
- Kingdom of Bithynia at its peak during the late reign of Prusias I (182 BC).
- Capital: Nicomedia
- Common languages: Koine Greek, Bithynian language, Phrygian language
- Government: Monarchy
- King
  - 297–278 BC: Zipoetes I (first)
  - c. 94–74 BC: Nicomedes IV (last)
- Historical era: Hellenistic period
  - Zipoetes I proclaims himself basileus: 297 BC
  - Nicomedes IV bequeathed the Kingdom of Bithynia to the Roman Republic: 74 BC
Succeeded by
Bithynia and Pontus
- Today part of: Turkey

The Kingdom of Bithynia (Ancient Greek: Βιθυνία) was a Hellenistic kingdom centred in the historical region of Bithynia, in northwest Anatolia, which seems to have been established in the 4th century BC. In the midst of the Wars of the Diadochi, Zipoites assumed the Greek title of basileus (meaning king) in 297 BC.

His son and successor, Nicomedes I, founded Nicomedia, which soon rose to great prosperity. During his long reign (c. 278 – c. 255 BC), as well as those of his successors, Prusias I (r. c. 228 – 182 BC), Prusias II (r. c. 182 – 149 BC) and Nicomedes II (r. c. 149 – 127 BC), the Kingdom of Bithynia prospered and had a considerable standing and influence among the minor monarchies of Anatolia. But the last king, Nicomedes IV, was unable to maintain himself in power against Mithridates VI of Pontus. After being restored to his throne by the Roman Senate, he bequeathed his kingdom through his will to the Roman republic in 74 BC and it became the province of Bithynia et Pontus in 74 BC. The coinage of these kings show their regal portraits, which tend to be engraved in an accomplished Hellenistic style.

== History ==
=== Early history ===
The population of Bithynia is thought to have been of Thracian origin. According to Memnon of Heraclea, the native prince Bas of Bithynia managed to defeat Alexander the Great's general Calas in battle (probably around 330 BC). His son Zipoites I assumed the Greek title basileus (meaning "king") in 297 BC.

His son and successor, Nicomedes I, founded Nicomedia, which soon rose to great prosperity, and during his long reign (c. 278 – c. 255 BC), Bithynia developed considerable standing and influence among the minor monarchies of Anatolia.

=== Roman ally ===
Under king Prusias I (r. c. 228 – 182 BC), Bithynia first came into contact with the Roman Republic. Bithynia remained neutral during the Roman–Seleucid War from 192 to 188 BC, despite the Seleucid Empire and its king Antiochus the Great being the long-time enemy of the kingdom.

Prusias I's son and successor, Prusias II of Bithynia, first opened relations with Rome. Following Prusias II's failed invasion of the Roman ally of the Kingdom of Pergamon in 154 BC, Bithynia was forced to pay heavy war reparations. Prusias II sent his son Nicomedes II of Bithynia to Rome to negotiate a reduction in the annual payments. Once in Rome, Nicomedes II gained the favor of the Roman Senate and, following a failed assassination attempt on Nicomedes II's life by his father Prusias II, the Senate supported Nicomedes II in his revolt against his father. Supported by Rome and Pergamon king Attalus II Philadelphus, Nicomedes II overthrew his father and became king in 149 BC and entered into an alliance with Rome.

Nicomedes II would be a loyal ally, actively supporting Rome's interests in the Aegean Sea and Black Sea. In 133 BC, King Attalus III of Pergamon died, bequeathing his kingdom to Rome. However, Eumenes III, claiming to be the illegitimate son of a former Pergamon king, claimed the throne and made war against the Romans. Though the Romans sent the Consul Publius Licinius Crassus Dives Mucianus to enforce their claims in 130 BC, Eumenes III defeated them and killed Crassus. Rome sent a second army in 129 BC under Marcus Perperna to face Pergamon pretender. Supported by forces under Nicomedes II, Perperna was able to defeat Eumenes III and secured Rome's claims in western Anatolia, allowing Rome to annex Pergamon directly as the province of Asia.

=== Roman client kingdom ===
==== First Mithridatic War (89–85 BC) ====
A map of Asia Minor in 89 BC at the start of the First Mithridatic War. Bithynia, dark red, is shown as a client kingdom of Rome, light red. Pontus is shown in dark green.

Relations between Bithynia and Rome soured during the reign of Nicomedes II's son and successor Nicomedes III over the influence over the central Anatolian kingdom of Cappadocia.

Becoming king in 127 BC, Nicomedes III conquered Paphlagonia along the Black Sea and began to expand his influence over the Roman ally of Cappadocia. In 116 BC, the Cappadocian king Ariarathes VI was murdered by the Cappadocian noble Gordius on orders from King Mithridates VI of Pontus. Mithridates VI then installed his sister Laodice of Cappadocia, Ariarathes VI's widow, as regent over for the infant Ariarathes VII, ensuring Pontic control over Cappadocia in the process.

Nicomedes III sought to take advantage of the political power vacuum in Cappadocia, invaded the kingdom, and refused to recognize the infant Ariarathes VII as Cappadocia's legitimate ruler. Laodice, mother of Nicomedes III's deceased wife Nysa, then married Nicomedes III to secure his hold over the kingdom. Mithridates VI swiftly invaded Cappadocia to prevent Nicomedes III from claiming the throne, expelled Nicomedes III, restored his nephew Ariarathes VII to the Cappadocian throne, and returned Cappadocia to Pontus' sphere of influence.

Following a rebellion in by Cappadocian nobles in 97 BC against Pontic control, both Nicomedes III and Mithridates VI sent emissaries to Rome in 95 BC asking the Republic to intervene in their struggle for dominance over the kingdom. The Roman Senate did not side with either party, however, and demanded both to withdraw from Cappadocia and ensure its independence.

The next year, in 94 BC, Nicomedes III died and was succeeded by his son, the pro-Roman Nicomedes IV of Bithynia, as king. In 93 BC, ignoring Rome's command to not interfere with Cappadocia's independence, soldiers from the Kingdom of Armenia under Tigranes the Great, son-in-law of Mithridates VI, invaded and conquered Cappadocia at the behest of the Pontic king. With Cappadocia secured, Mithridates VI invaded Bithynia, defeating Nicomedes IV in 90 BC, annexing his kingdom.

Nicomedes IV sought the protection of Rome. Upon arriving in Italy, the Senate sent a delegation to Pontus, demanding Mithridates restore Nicomedes IV to his throne. Though the Social War was still raging in Italy, Rome was able to successfully restore both kings due to the Republic's growing influence in the region.

Once restored to his throne, the Senate encouraged Nicomedes IV to raid Mithridates VI's territories. Mithridates VI invaded Bithynia in 88 BC, again forcing Nicomedes IV to flee to Rome. In response to the ousting of Nicomedes IV and Mithridates VI's growing power, the Senate declared war against Pontus and sent the Consul Lucius Cornelius Sulla east to defeat Mithridates VI. Rome's victory over Mithridates VI in 85 BC and the subsequent Treaty of Dardanos secured Rome as the major power in Anatolia, restored Nicomedes IV to his throne, and further brought Bithynia into closer ties with the Republic.

==== Interwar period (85–73 BC) ====
Bithynia enjoyed 12 years of relative peace. It stayed neutral during the Second Mithridatic War (83–81 BC).

From 80 BC to 78 BC, during the dictatorship of Sulla, Julius Caesar fled to Bithynia to avoid being killed in Sulla's proscription.

==== Third Mithridatic War (73–63 BC) ====
Eastern Anatolia and the Caucasus region around 50 AD. The boundaries shown correspond approximately to those around 64 BC following the Third Mithridatic War.

Due to the internal political struggle between Lucius Cornelius Sulla, Gaius Marius, and Lucius Cornelius Cinna, Rome had been unable to definitively defeat Pontic King Mithridates VI. In 74 BC, King Nicomedes IV of Bithynia died and, hoping to secure his kingdom from further Pontic aggression, bequeathed his kingdom to Rome. The Senate immediately voted to annex the kingdom as a province directly governed by the Republic.

Nicomedes IV's death caused a power vacuum in Asia Minor, allowing Mithridates VI to invade and conquer the leaderless kingdom. With Mithridates VI again having designs on Roman protectorates in Asia Minor, including Bithynia, Rome launched a third war against Pontus. Dispatching Consul Lucius Licinius Lucullus to Asia, Rome drove Pontus and its ally Armenia out of Asia proper, reasserted Roman dominance over Anatolia by 71 BC, and conquered the Kingdom of Pontus.

Mithridates VI then fled to his ally the Kingdom of Armenia, which was invaded by Lucullus in 69 BC. Despite his initial successes, however, Lucullus was under able to bring the war against Pontus to a close as Mithridates VI remained at-large. Recalling Lucullus, the Senate dispatched Gnaeus Pompeius Magnus ("Pompey") to the East to finally defeat Mithridates VI. Arriving in Asia Minor in 65 BC, Pompey decisively defeated Mithridates VI in the Caucasus Mountains of Kingdom of Armenia.

The province of Pontus, which was conquered and created by the Roman Empire's from the Pontus in 65 BC, was combined with the province of Bithynia, which was created in 74 BC when the last Bithynian king Nicomedes IV, left the Kingdom of Bithynia to the Roman Empire with a will, and was attached to the province of Bithynia and Pontus.

== See also ==
- Bithynian coinage
- List of rulers of Bithynia
- Ancient regions of Anatolia
- Empire of Nicaea
- Byzantine Empire
- Ottoman empire

== Bibliography ==
- "Memnon: History of Heracleia". attalus.org. Translated by Smith, Andrew. 2004.
- Williams, Wynne, ed. (1990). Correspondence with Trajan from Bythinia (Epistles X, 15–121). Oxford: Oxford University Press. p. 159. ISBN 9780856684081.
