= Nicomedes I of Bithynia =

Basileus of Bithynia from 278 to c. 255 BC

Nicomedes I
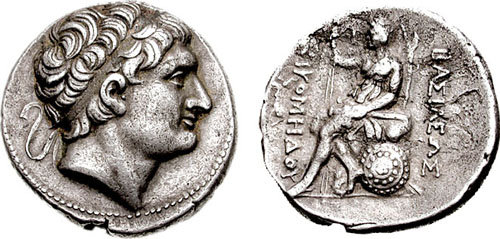
- Coin of Nikomedes I of Bithynia. Obverse shows head of Nikomedes diademed. Reverse shows Bendis seated; legend ΒΑΣΙΛΕΩΣ ΝΙΚΟΜΗΔΟΥ[Σ].

Basileus of Bithynia
- Reign: c. 278–255 BC
- Predecessor: Zipoetes I
- Successor: Etazeta of Bithynia
- Born: c. 300 BC
- Died: c. 255 BC
- Consort: Ditizele; Etazeta
- Issue: Ziaelas; Prusias; Lysandra
- Father: Zipoetes I

Nicomedes I (Ancient Greek: Νικομήδης; lived c. 300 BC – c. 255 BC, reigned 278 BC – c. 255 BC), second king of Bithynia, was the eldest son of Zipoetes I, whom he succeeded on the throne in 278 BC.

== Life ==
He began his reign by killing two of his brothers, but the third, later called Zipoetes II, rebelled against him and managed to maintain independent sovereignty over a considerable part of Bithynia for some time. Meanwhile, Nicomedes was threatened with invasion by Antiochus I Soter, king of the Seleucid Empire, who had already made war on his father, Zipoetes I. To strengthen himself against this danger, he formed an alliance with Heraclea Pontica and, shortly afterwards, with Antigonus II Gonatas. The threatened attack passed with few casualties. Antiochus did in fact invade Bithynia, but withdrew without risking battle.

It was against his brother rather than his foreign enemies that Nicomedes now called in more powerful auxiliaries and formed an alliance with the Celts, who had arrived on the other side of the Bosphorus under Leonnorius and Lutarius and were at this time engaged in the siege of Byzantium in 277 BC. After providing them with the means to cross into Asia, where they founded Galatia, he turned the weapons of his new auxiliaries against Zipoetes II, whom he defeated and killed, thus reuniting the whole of Bithynia under his rule.

Little is known of the events that followed. It is likely that the Celts subsequently supported Nicomedes against Antiochus, but no details are recorded, either of the war or of the peace which ended it. It seems, however, that Nicomedes was left in the undisturbed possession of Bithynia, which he ruled from this time until his death, and which rose to great power and prosperity during his long and peaceful reign.

Following in the footsteps of his father and so many other Greek rulers of Asia, he decided to perpetuate his own name by founding a new capital, and the site he chose, near the Megarian colony of Astakos, was so wisely chosen that the city of Nicomedia remained one of the richest and most prosperous in Anatolia for more than six centuries. The founding of Nicomedia is placed by Eusebius in 264 BC.

The length of Nicomedes' reign after this event is unknown, but his death is dated to around 255 BC. He had been married twice; by his first wife, Ditizele, a Phrygian by birth, he had two sons, Prusias and Ziaelas, and a daughter, Lysandra; but his second wife, Etazeta, persuaded him to put aside his children from his first marriage and leave his crown to her offspring.

The latter were still infants at the time of his death, so he left them in the care of two kings, Antigonus II Gonatas and Ptolemy II Philadelphus, along with the free cities of Heraclea Pontica, Byzantium and Cius. But despite these precautions, his son Ziaelas quickly established himself on the throne. It was probably this Nicomedes who tried to buy the famous statue of Venus by Praxiteles from the city of Knidos, offering to cancel all the city's public debts.

== Notes ==
Preceded by Zipoetes I	King of Bithynia; 278–255 BC	Succeeded by Etazeta
