= Prusias II of Bithynia =

Prusias II "The Hunter"
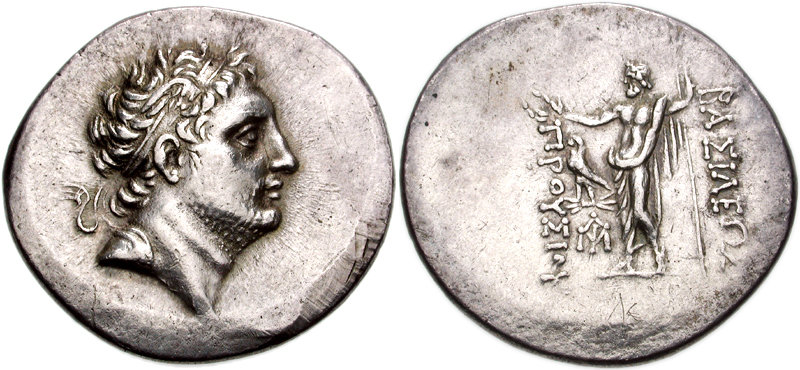
- Tetradrachm of Prusias II

King of Bithynia
- Reign: 182 – 149 BC
- Predecessor: Prusias I
- Successor: Nicomedes II
- Born: c. 220 BC; Bithynia (modern-day Turkey)
- Died: 149 BC (aged 71); Nicomedia (modern-day İzmit, Kocaeli, Turkey)
- Consort: Apame IV
- Issue: Nicomedes II; Apama; Unnamed children by second wife
- Greek: Προυσίας
- Father: Prusias I
- Mother: Apama III
- Religion: Greek Polytheism

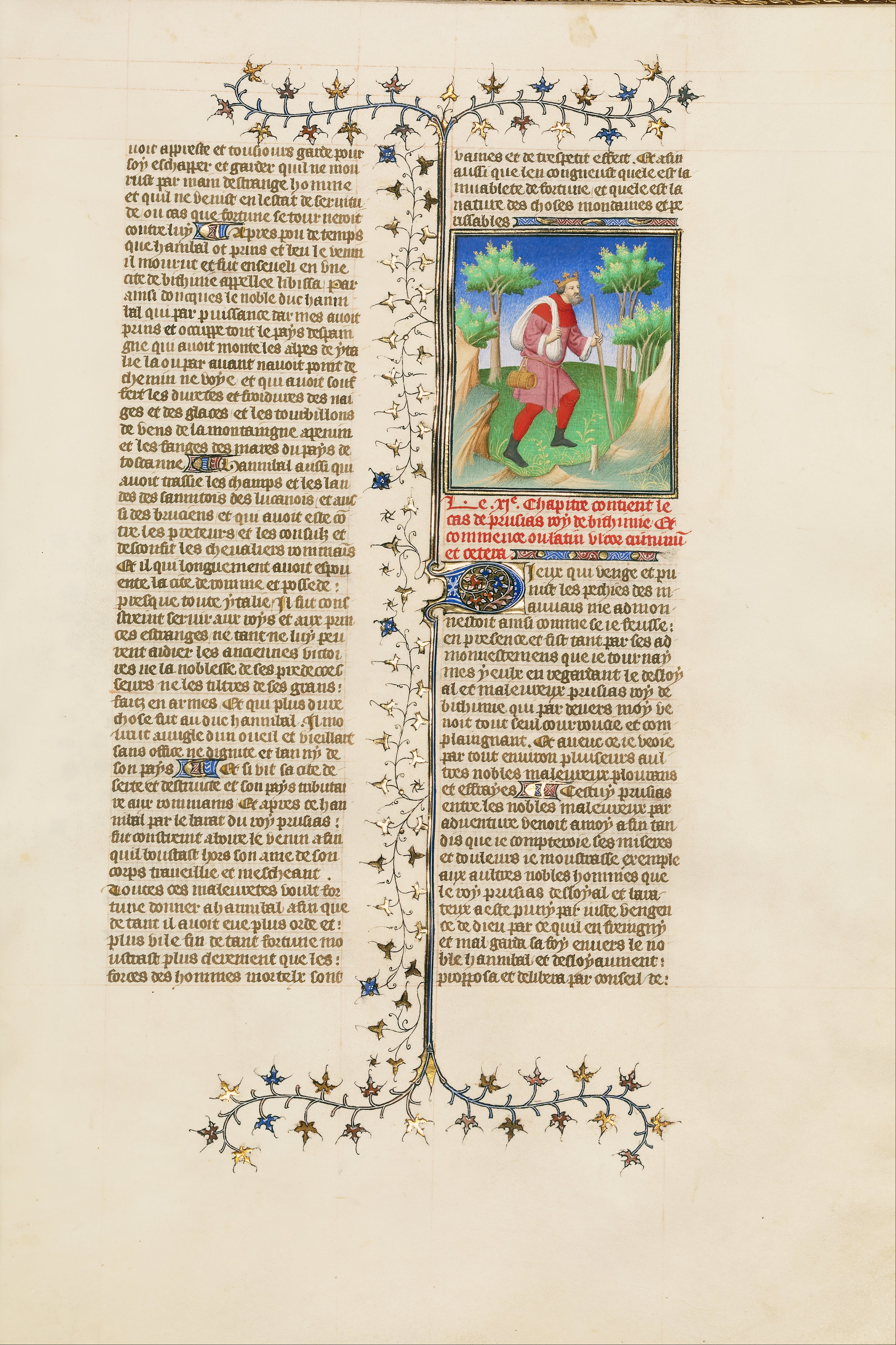
Prusias II, King of Bithynia, Reduced to Begging

Prusias II Cynegus (Greek: Προυσίας ὁ Κυνηγός; "the Hunter", c. 220 BC – 149 BC, reigned c. 182 BC – 149 BC) was the Greek king of Bithynia. He was the son and successor of Prusias I and Apama III.

== Life ==
Prusias was born to Prusias I and Apama III in 220 BC. His father died in 189 BC, at which point he became the king of Bithynia. Prusias II joined with the king of Pergamon, Eumenes II in a war against King Pharnaces I of Pontus (181–179 BC). He later invaded the territories of Pergamon (156–154 BC), only to be defeated, with Pergamon insisting on heavy reparations, including 500 talents and "twenty decked ships".

Prusias II married his maternal cousin Apame IV, a sister of Perseus of Macedon and a princess from the Antigonid dynasty, by whom he had a son, Nicomedes II, and a daughter, Apama, who would marry Dyegilos, son of Cotys IV, King of Thrace, and his wife, Semestra.

Prusias II was honoured by the Aetolian League with a stele at Delphi on account of his behavior and benefactions towards them.

Towards the end of his life, Prusias II had children by a later wife, and wanted to make them his heirs in place of Nicomedes. He sent Nicomedes to Rome to ask its help in reducing the amount of these reparations, and directed the co-ambassador, Menas, to kill Nicomedes if the mission was unsuccessful. Despite the failure of the mission, Nicomedes persuaded Menas to betray Prusias, and Nicomedes declared himself king. Prusias had to renounce the kingship in favour of his son and was himself murdered in 149 BC.

Preceded by Prusias I	King of Bithynia; 182 BC – 149 BC	Succeeded by Nicomedes II
