= Prusias I of Bithynia =

King of Bithynia, 228–182 BC

Prusias I Cholas
- Basileus
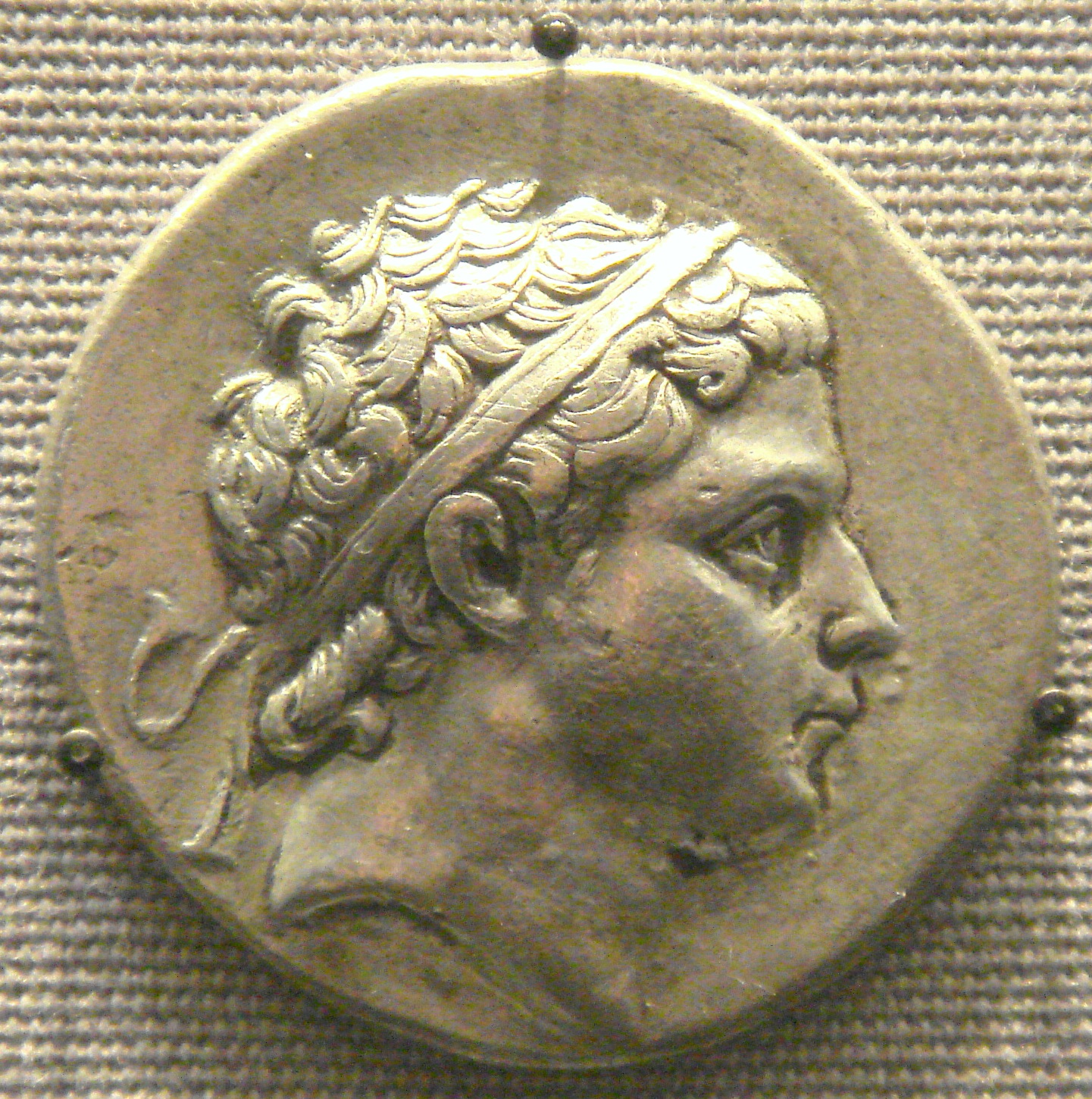
- Tetradrachm of Prusias I (young)

King of Bithynia
- Reign: 228–182 BC
- Predecessor: Ziaelas
- Successor: Prusias II
- Born: c. 243 BC; Bithynia (modern-day Northern Anatolia, Turkey)
- Died: 182 BC (aged 61); Bithynia
- Consort: Apama
- Issue: Prusias II
- Greek: Λευκών
- Father: Ziaelas
- Mother: Unknown
- Religion: Greek Polytheism

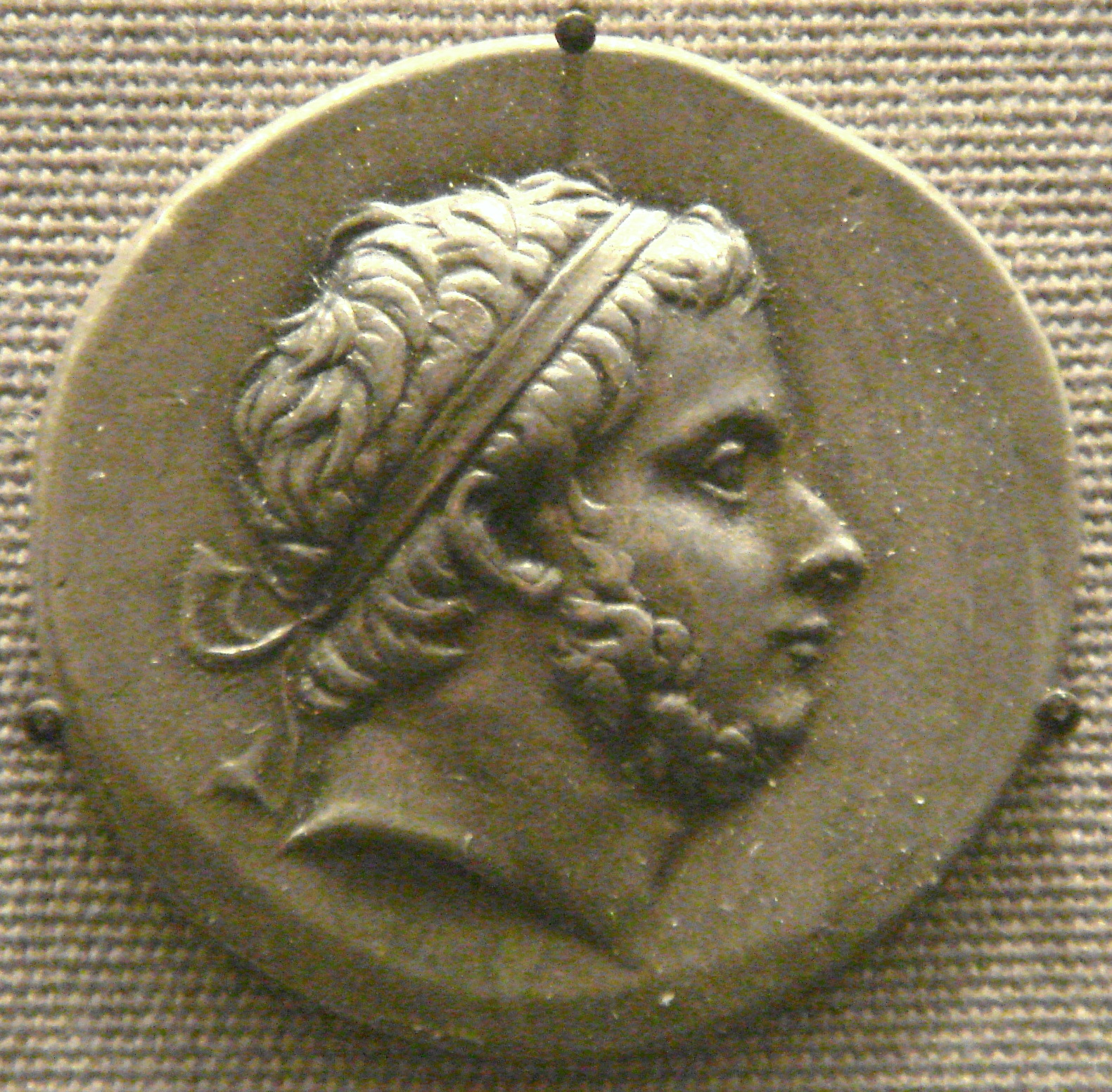
Tetradrachm of Prusias I (older and bearded). British Museum.

Prusias I Cholus (Ancient Greek: Προυσίας ὁ Χωλός, romanized: Prousías ho Chōlós, lit. 'the Lame'; c. 243 – 182 BC) was a King of Bithynia that reigned from c. 228 to 182 BC.

== Life and reign ==
Prusias was the son of King Ziaelas of Bithynia and an unknown woman. He was crowned king in c. 228 BC, succeeding his father. A vigorous and energetic leader; he fought a war against Byzantium in 220 BC, seizing its Asiatic territory. Then, Prusias defeated the Galatians, whom Nicomedes I had previously invited across the Bosphorus to a territory called Arisba, and putting to death all of their women and children and letting his men plunder their baggage.

At some point during his reign, Prusias formed a marriage alliance with King Demetrius II of Macedon, receiving the latter's daughter, Apama, as his wife.

Prusias expanded the territories of Bithynia in a series of wars against King Attalus I of Pergamon and Heraclea Pontica on the Black Sea, taking various cities formerly owned by the Heracleans and renaming one of them, Cierus, to Prusias after himself. While besieging Heraclea Pontica, Prusias was hit with a stone while climbing a ladder and broke his leg; the siege was lifted due to his injury, even though the besieged city was close to being captured. This is likely how he was given the title "the lame". He was brother-in-law of King Philip V of Macedon. Philip V granted him the cities of Kios and Myrleia in 202 BC. Prusias renamed these cities as Prusias (present-day Bursa, Turkey) and Apameia respectively. Although he granted sanctuary to Hannibal, who successfully employed an odd stratagem against the Pergamene for him at sea, he remained neutral during the war between the Roman Republic and the Seleucid Empire, refusing an alliance with the Seleucid King Antiochus III. He agreed on peace terms with presumably Eumenes II of Pergamon in 183 BC, in the city of Cyzicus. Apama bore him a son with the same name, who later succeeded him.

== See also ==
- Prusias ad Hypium, ancient city in Düzce Province, Turkey

== Sources ==
- Habicht, Christian, s.v. Prusias I., RE. Bd. ХХШ, 1. 1957

| Preceded by Ziaelas | King of Bithynia; 228 BC – 182 BC | Succeeded by Prusias II |
