= Titias =

One of the Idaean Dactyls

In Greek mythology, Titias (/tiˈti.as/; Ancient Greek: Τιτίας) or Titius (/tˈɪ.ʃəs/; Ancient Greek: Τίτιος, romanized: Titios) was one of the Idaean Dactyls.

== Mythology ==
Titias and his brother Cyllenus were said to have been venerated in Phrygia as companions of Cybele and "guides of fate of cities". The two, as well as the other Idaean Dactyls of Crete, were sons of the nymph Anchiale. As to the father, Titias was said to have been either a son of Zeus and one of the Idaean Dactyls, or the eldest of the sons of Mariandynus, son of Phrixus or Cimmerius. Some sources spoke of him as a local hero of the Mariandyni tribe in Northern Anatolia under whose leadership the population increased and was brought to prosperity, and who was eventually deified by the Mariandynians. A city was named Titios after him.

Titias' sons were Priolaus, Lycus and Mariandynus; some authors named Bormus instead of Priolaus, as both were noted for having mourning songs performed in memory of them. Priolaus was said to have been killed in a battle against the Bebrycians, which the Mariandynians won thanks to the assistance of Heracles, who also won a competition against a local man during the funeral games of Priolaus.

== See also ==
- Dascylus
