= Konuralp Museum =

Turkish museum

- Konuralp Müzesi
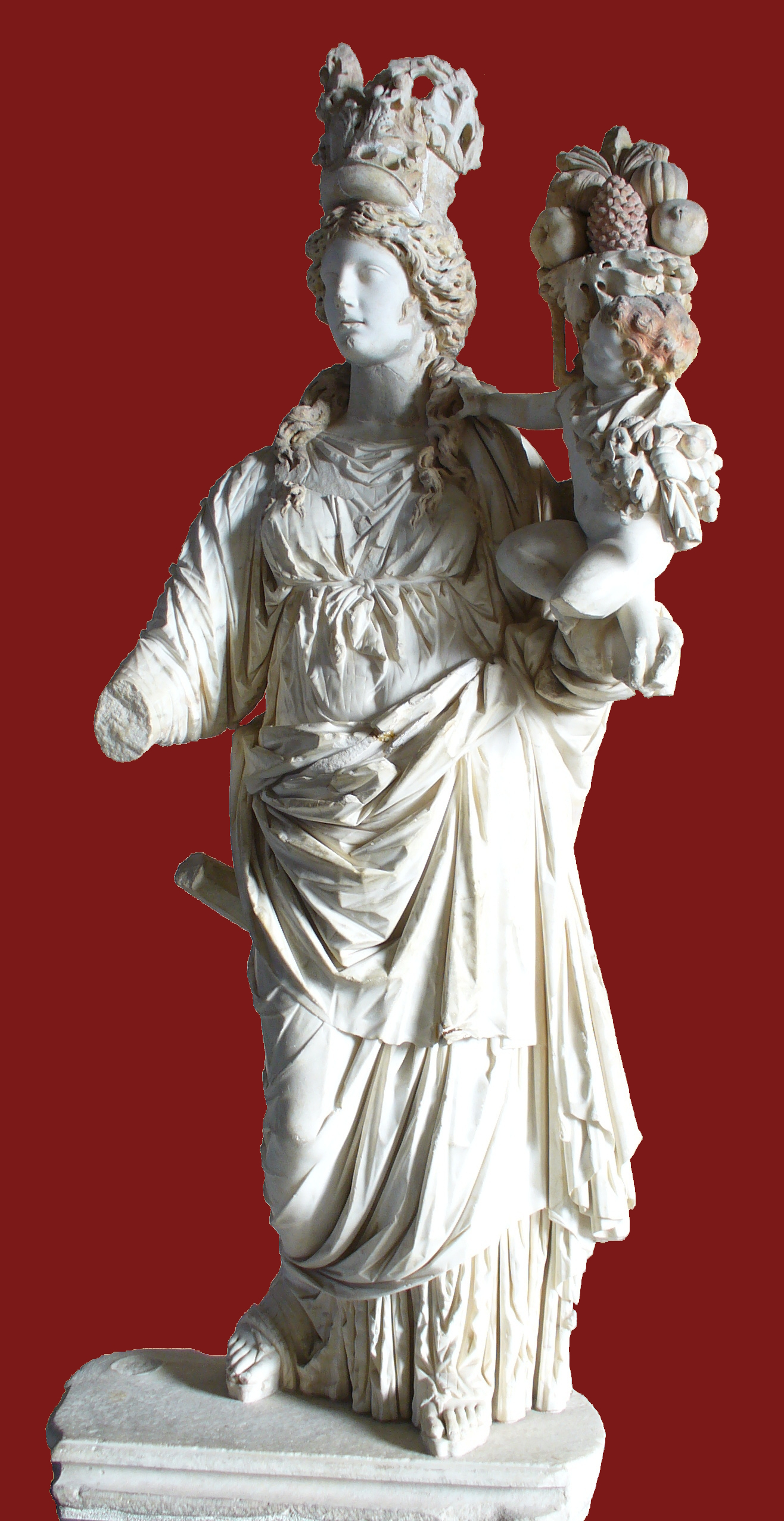

- Konuralp Museum
- Established: 1994; 32 years ago
- Coordinates: 40°54′14″N 31°09′13″E
- Type: Archaeology, Ethnography
- Collection size: 1788
- Owner: Ministry of Culture

Konuralp Museum is a museum in Düzce Province, Turkey. The town of Konuralp is named after an early Ottoman hero in Düzce Province and is almost merged to Düzce city. The museum, situated on Cumhuriyet street at 40°54′14″N 31°09′13″E, opened on 18 November 1994.

The museum building has three exhibition halls, one laboratory, a conference room, two stock rooms and rooms reserved for the administration.

There are 1788 archaeological items in the museum. Konuralp is founded on the remains of Prusias ad Hypium of the antiquity. The origin of the exhibited items are from Prusias Ad Hypium. A 1st-century sarcophagus, Orpheus mosaic, the mosaic of Achilles and Thetis and the 2nd-century copy of Tyche and Plutus sculpture are among the notable items in the museum. There are 456 ethnographic items. In ethnography section clothes, weapons, daily-usage articles et.c about Late Ottoman era are exhibited. There are also 3837 coins from Hellenistic to Ottoman era.
