= Idyll X =

Poem by Theocritus

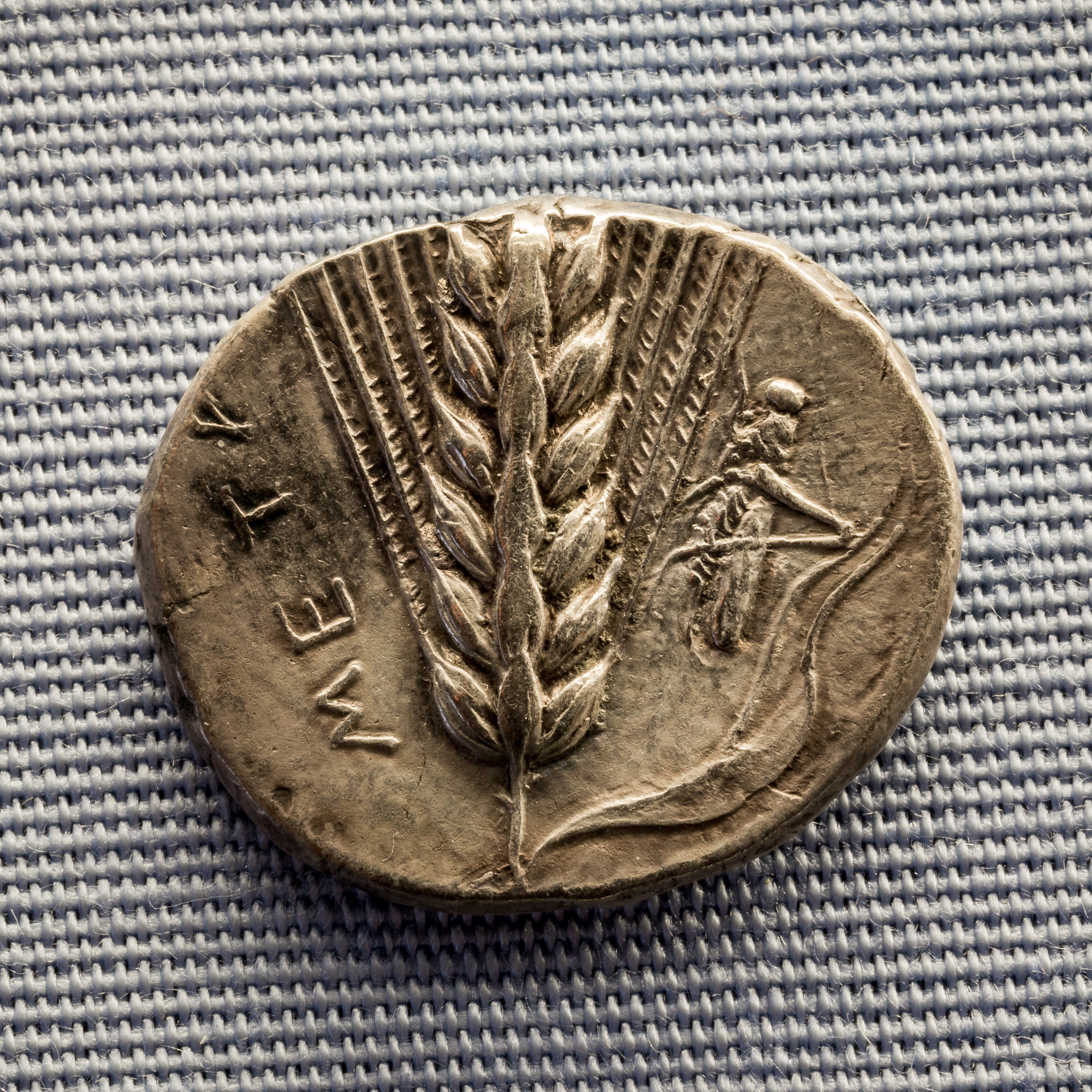
Silver stater of Metapontum: 400 BC. Barley ear and grasshopper (rev.)

Idyll X, sometimes called Θερισταί ('The Reapers') or Εργατίναι ('The Labourers'), is a bucolic poem by the 3rd-century BC Greek poet Theocritus. The poem takes the form of a dialogue between the old foreman Milon, as he levels the swathes of corn, and his languid and love-worn companion, the reaper Bucaeus.

== Summary ==
They all call thee a 'gipsy', gracious Bombyca, and 'lean', and 'sunburnt', 'tis only I that call thee 'honey-pale'

The characters of this pastoral are two reapers, Milon, the man of experience, and Bucaeus, called also Bucus or Buttus, the lovesick youth. The conversation takes place in the course of their reaping, and leads to a love-song from Bucaeus and a reaping-song from Milon. Milon's song, after a prayer to Demeter, addresses itself in succession to binders, threshers, and reapers, and lastly to the steward. Both songs are supposed to be impromptu, and sung as the men reap on.

== Analysis ==
When Milon calls his song the song of the divine Lityerses he is using a generic term. There was at least one traditional reaping-song which told how Lityerses, son of Midas, of Celaenae in Phrygia, after entertaining strangers' hospitality, made them reap with him till evening, when he cut off their heads and hid their bodies in the sheaves. This apparently gave the name to all reaping-songs.

== Reception ==
According to Andrew Lang, the verses in which Milon defends his 'gipsy' love "have been the keynote of much later poetry", including the fourth book of Lucretius and the Misanthrope of Molière.

== See also ==
- The Nut-Brown Maid

== Sources ==
- Cairns, Francis (1970). "Theocritus Idyll 10". Hermes. 98 (1): 38–44.

Attribution:

- Edmonds, J. M., ed. (1919). The Greek Bucolic Poets (3rd ed.). William Heinemann. pp. 129–37.
- Lang, Andrew, ed. (1880). Theocritus, Bion, and Moschus. London: Macmillan and Co. pp. 53–6.
