= Bormus =

Bormus (Ancient Greek: Βῶρμος), or Borimus (Βῶριμος) in a Greek mythology of North Anatolian origin, was a Mariandynian, son of a rich and illustrious man named Upius or Titias or Tityos, and was distinguished for his extraordinary beauty. Once during the time of harvest, when he went to a well to fetch water for the reapers, he was drawn into the well by the nymphs, and never appeared again. For this reason, the country people in Bithynia celebrated his memory every year at the time of harvest with plaintive songs (βῶρμοι) with the accompaniment of their flutes. The harvest-song for Phrygian Lityerses was, according to one tradition, a comic version of the lament sung by the Mariandyni for Bormos. The myth of him is parallel to, and is connected with the same location as that of Hylas.
