= Mariandynus =

In Greek mythology, Mariandynus (/ˌmæriænˈdaɪnəs/; Ancient Greek: Μαριανδυνός) was the eponymous hero of the Mariandyni tribe in Northern Anatolia. He was an Aeolian, a son of either Cimmerius, or Phrixus, or Phineus (and in the latter case, brother of Thynus). He had several sons, of whom the eldest may have been Titias.

Mariandynus was also the name of his grandson through Titias, who was credited with composing a mourning song in honor of his brother Priolaus, killed in a battle against the Bebrycians.
