= Konur Alp =

Ottoman military commander

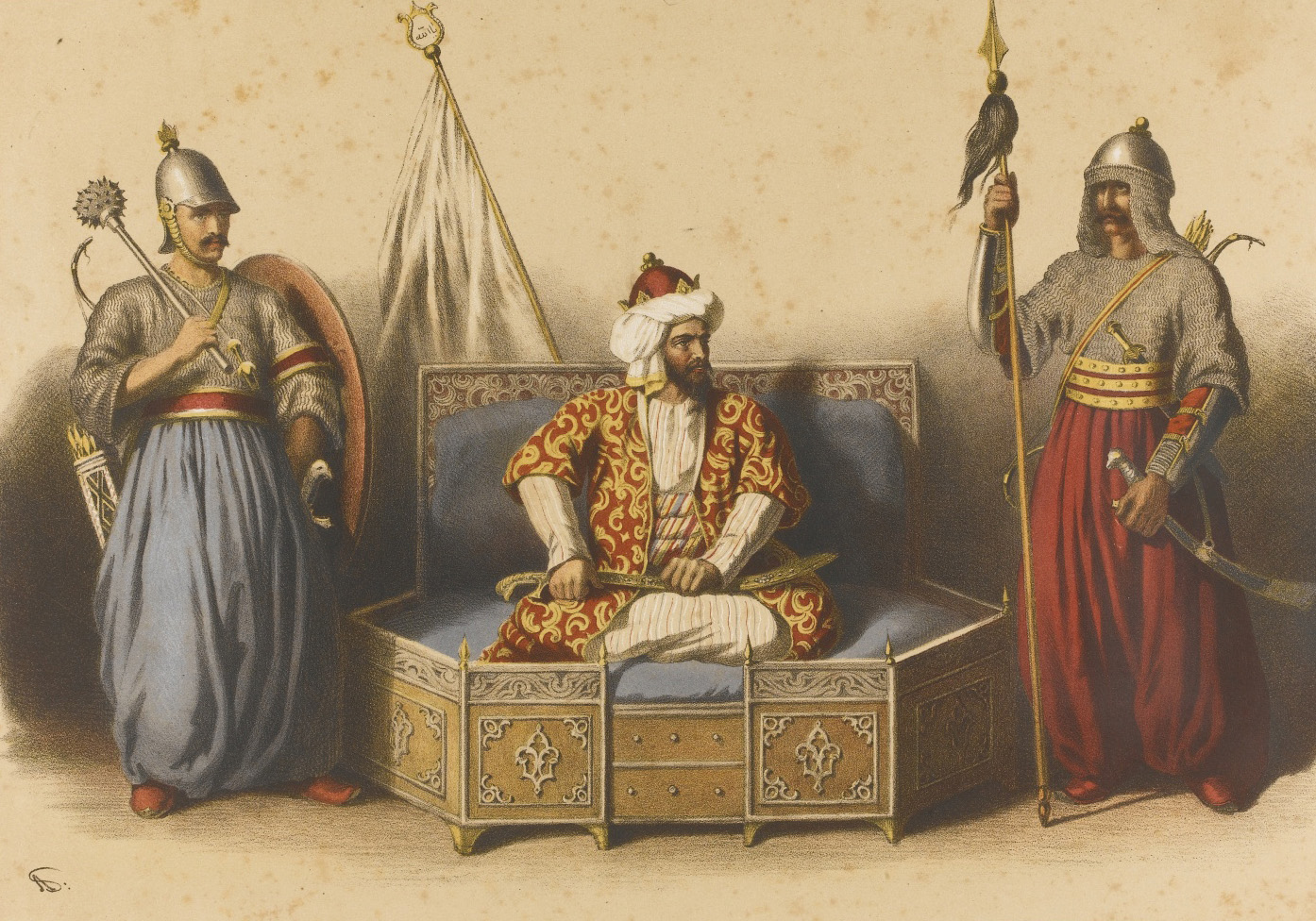
- Konur Alp (right); Osman I (middle), and Akça Koca (left); 19th century illustration
- Born: Unknown
- Died: 1328
- Allegiance: Ottoman Empire
- Rank: Military commander

Konur Alp, Konuralp or Konuralp Bey (Ottoman Turkish: قونور آلپ; d. 1328) was one of the warriors of Osman I and Orhan. Konur Alp was among the early commanders who served in the establishment of the Ottoman State.

== Biography ==
Since 1300, when Osman I started the struggle against the Byzantines, Konur Alp was also present along with his fellow soldiers such as Akça Koca, Samsa Çavuş, Aykut Alp, and Abdurrahman Gazi.

Since Orhan Gazi took over the military administration while his father was still alive, he sent Konur Alp to take over the region towards the Black Sea. Konur Alp conquered Akyazı, Mudurnu, Sakarya, and Melen Basin. According to Ashikpashazade, he took Aydos Castle with the help of Gazi Abdurrahman on the orders of Orhan. In 1321, Mudanya was captured on the Sea of Marmara, which was the port of Bursa. Orhan then sent a column under Konur Alp towards Western Black Sea coast, prior to taking Bursa. In 1323, the city of Prusias ad Hypium was conquered from the Byzantine Empire by Osman Gazi (r. c. 1299–1323/4). Osman Ghazi handed over the city's control to his commander Konur Alp. In 1326, he played a vital role in the conquest of Bursa.

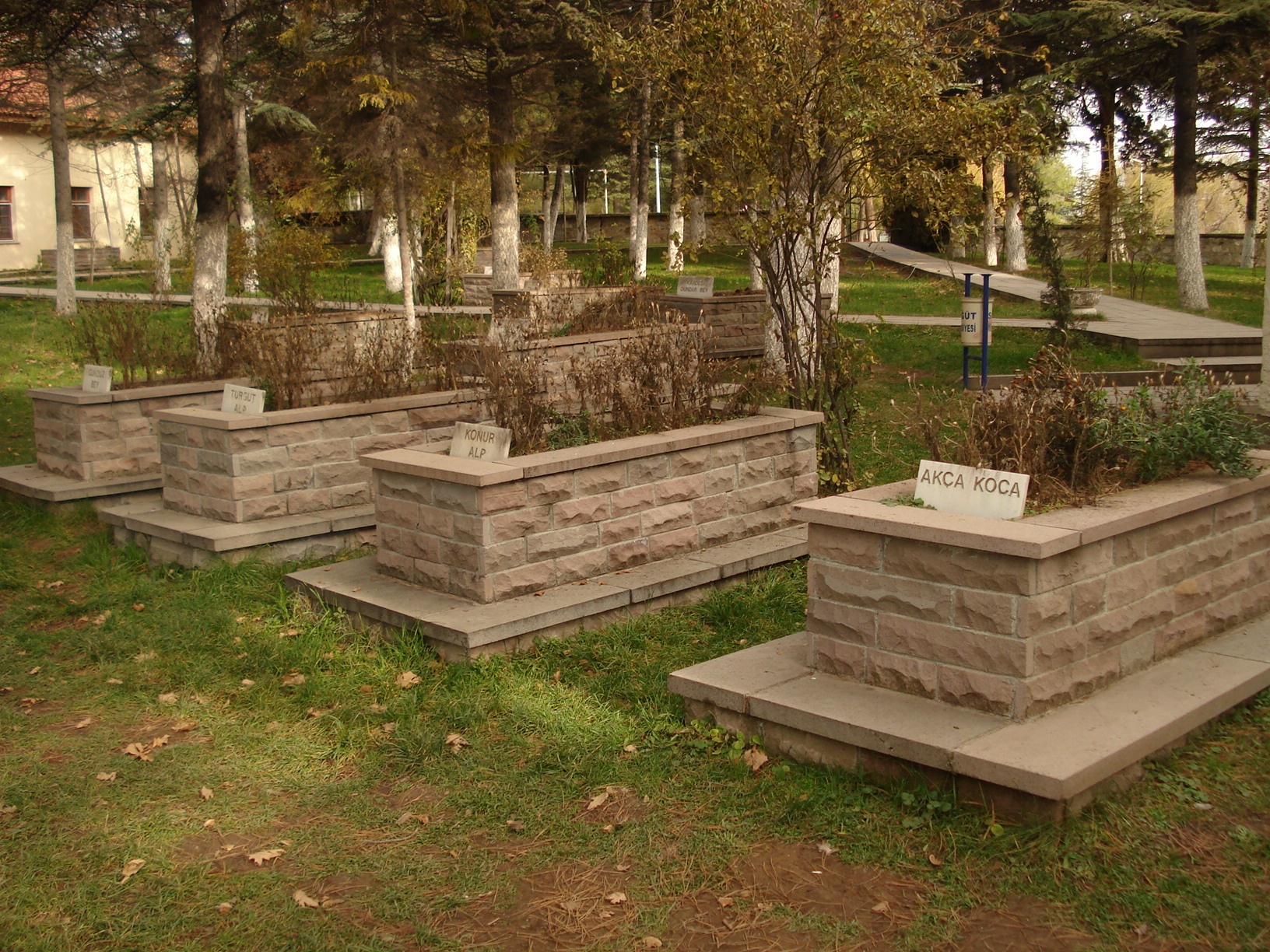
Honorary grave of Konur Alp (third from far-left)

Konur died in 1328 and is believed to have been buried in Düzce. After Konur Alp's death, the places under his administration were combined and given to Murad I.

== See also ==
- Konur Alp at List of Kuruluş: Osman characters
- Turgut Alp
- Köse Mihal
- Konuralp Museum
