= Prusias ad Hypium =

Ruined city located in Düzce Province, Turkey

- Konuralp
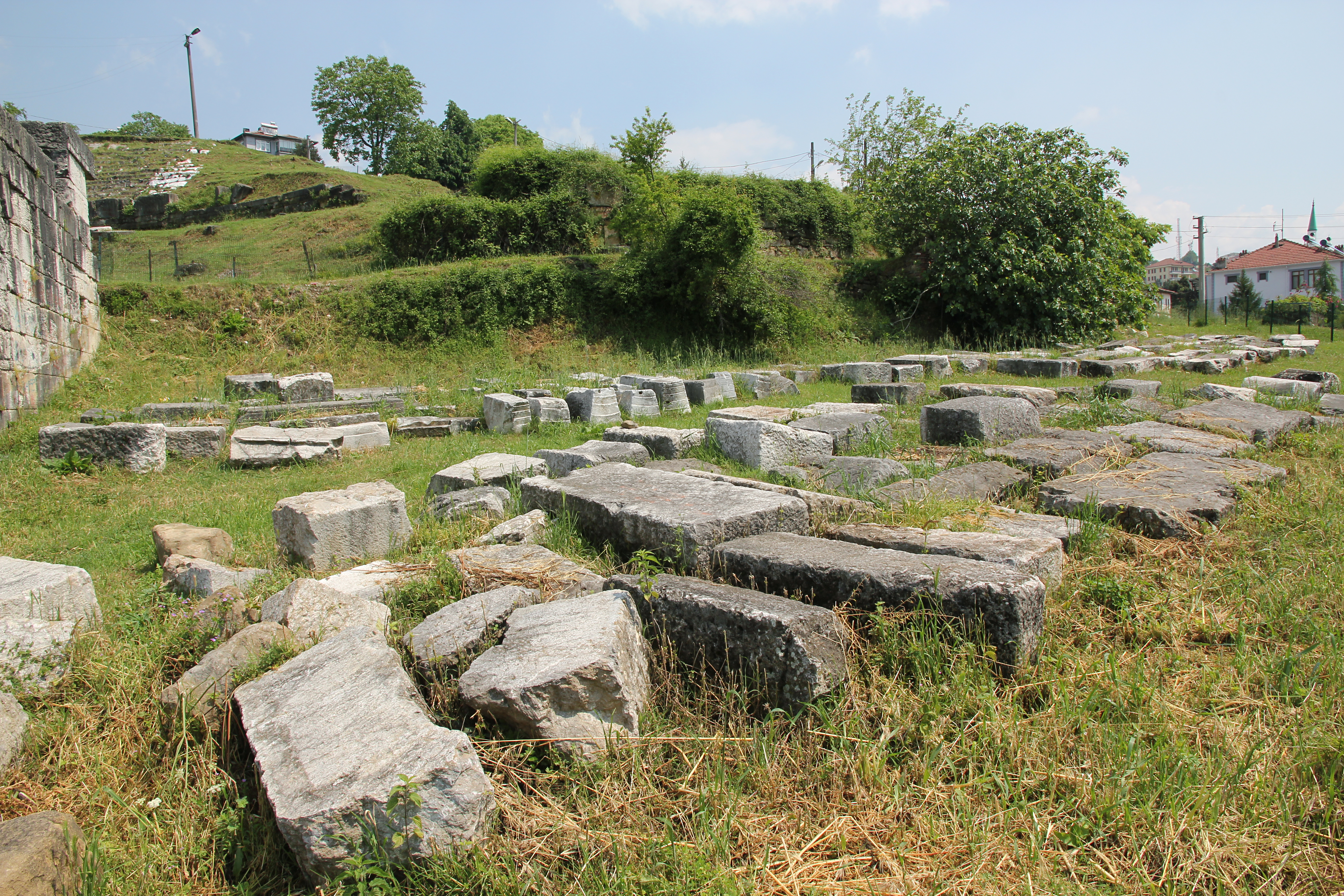
- Stone fragments at Prusias ad Hypium ruins.

- Location within Turkey
- 40°54′22″N 31°08′53″E
- Type: Settlement
- Periods: Hellenistic, Roman, Byzantine, Ottoman
- Location: Turkey
- Region: Düzce Province

Site notes
- Public access: Limited

Prusias ad Hypium (Ancient Greek: Προῦσα πρὸς τῷ Ὑππίῳ ποταμῷ) was a city in ancient Bithynia, and afterwards in the late Roman province of Honorias. In the 4th century it became a bishopric that was a suffragan of Claudiopolis in Honoriade. Before its conquest by King Prusias I of Bithynia, it was named Cierus or Kieros (Ancient Greek: Κίερος) and belonged to the Heraclea Pontica. Photius writes that it was called Kieros, after the river which flows by it.

== Location ==
The site is near Konuralp, 8 km (5.0 mi) north of Düzce on the road to Akçakoca, in northwestern Turkey.

== History ==
The settlement, initially named "Hypios", was later renamed "Kieros". According to Ancient Greek historical writer Memnon of Heraclea (c. 1st century), King Prusias I of Bithynia (r. 228 – 182 BC) captured the town of Kieros from the Heracleans, united it to his dominions, and changed its name to "Prusias". Pliny and Ptolemy merely mention it, one placing it at the foot of Mt. Hypius, the other east of the river Hypius. It was an important city on the road between Nicomedia (modern İzmit) at Propontis and Amastris (Amasra) at Euxine in the Pontus region.

In about 74 BC, control of the region, and so of the city, was taken by the Roman Empire. From then on, the city was called "Prusias ad Hypium". The city grew from four to twelve phylai during the Roman period until the 2nd century. Three Roman emperors, Hadrian (r. 117–138), Caracalla (r. 198–217), and Elagabalus (r. 218–222), visited the city in northwestern Asia Minor. Already after the reign of Vespasian (r. 69–79), the city became autonomous in internal affairs and minted its own coins, though it remained dependent to Rome in foreign policy. In the beginning of the 5th century, the city became part of the newly established late Roman province of Honorias, and after 451 AD, it lost its wealth towards the end of the Byzantine period.

In 1323, the city was conquered from the Byzantine Empire by Osman Ghazi (r. c. 1299 – 1323/4), the founder of the Ottoman Empire. Osman Ghazi handed over the city's control to his commander Konur Alp Bey. In the Ottoman period, the city center was abandoned, and the settlement was called "Üskübü" from σκοπή (skopi) meaning "watchtower". During the Ottoman period, Islamic culture became prevalent.

With the beginning of the Republican era (after 1923), the town's name was changed to "Konuralp". The name "Üskübü" is still used among the inhabitants.

== Archaeology ==
In the 19th century, travellers passing by the city discovered archaeological fragments. There are official letters preserved in the Ottoman Archives indicating archaeological findings. The transport of a marble sculpture to the Istanbul Archaeology Museums in 1893–94 is mentioned in documents. Documents dated 1903 and 1909 relate to regulations for reuse and to secure archaeological findings until their delivery to the government, respectively.

Scientific archaeological excavations were conducted by the archaeology department of Düzce University under the patronage of the Konuralp Museum and supported by the Municipality of Düzce.

A plan of the city is not known. The archaeological remains and finds suggest that the settlement had a Hellenistic polis character. Main remains are part of the ramparts, a rampart gate, open-air theatre, aqueduct, and a Roman bridge. Some remnants of the ancient city are under the buildings of the modern settlement of vernacular architecture.

According to inscriptions found at the site, a gymnasium and an agora existed in the ancient city. Their location and plan remain unknown. An inscription states that people contributed money to the construction and repair works of the agora. Another public building in the city, of which the location is not known, is the Domitius bathhouse, mentioned on the honor inscription erected for the son of M. Iulius Cabinius Sacerdos of Prusias. A colonnaded street runs southwest from the Roman bridge. Architectural fragments such as entablatures, arches, pediments, pavements, and drains are found on the site. A bath and aqueduct are from the early Ottoman period.

In 2020, archaeologists discovered a Medusa head dating back to the 1st or 2nd century AD. In 2023, archaeologists found the head of Alexander the Great's statue.

=== City walls and the "Horse Gate" ===
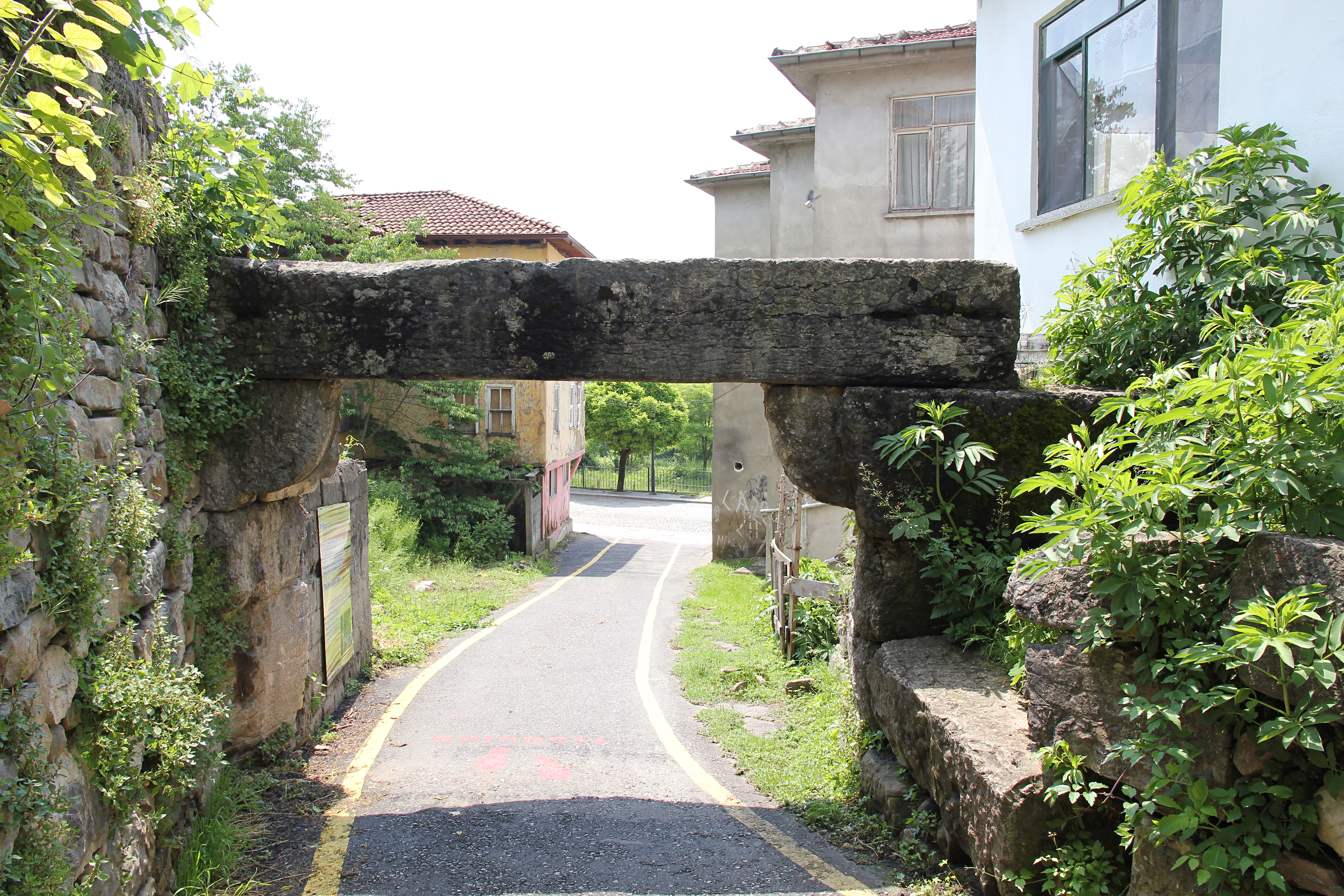
The "Horse Gate"

The ramparts of the city were built suitable to the topography of the terrain. The western city walls are 4.70 m (15.4 ft) high at a length of 118 m (387 ft). The city walls were built during the Hellenistic and Roman periods in ashlar. Some cut stones were reused in altar and other architectural elements during the repairs in the Byzantine Empire. At the western end of the walls, there is an entrance built with reused block stones. 200 m (660 ft) of the Byzantine city walls are still standing. These walls start right across the ancient bridge located at the edge of the road to Akçakoca, and run as far as Hamam Street. Some of the walls remaining in the gardens of the houses form the foundations of the garden walls. There are also walls dating back to the Ottoman period on the high parts of the slope where the city was founded.

Coins from the time of Roman emperor Gallienus (r. 253–268) depict the main gate of the city with two towers. This gate is not extant. The "Horse Gate", which stands today within the settlement of Konuralp, and its extension ramparts are monuments of first grade. The city walls were repaired in different periods with reused inscribed materials. The gate lintel is made of local limestone material. It is a reused grave stele with an ancient Greek inscription dedicated to the mother of a Prusiasan and features a horse relief. The city wall extending in a southeast direction from the gate is connected to a square-plan tower. There is a small gate, formed by reused inscribed stone blocks, on the southern walls.

=== Theatre ===
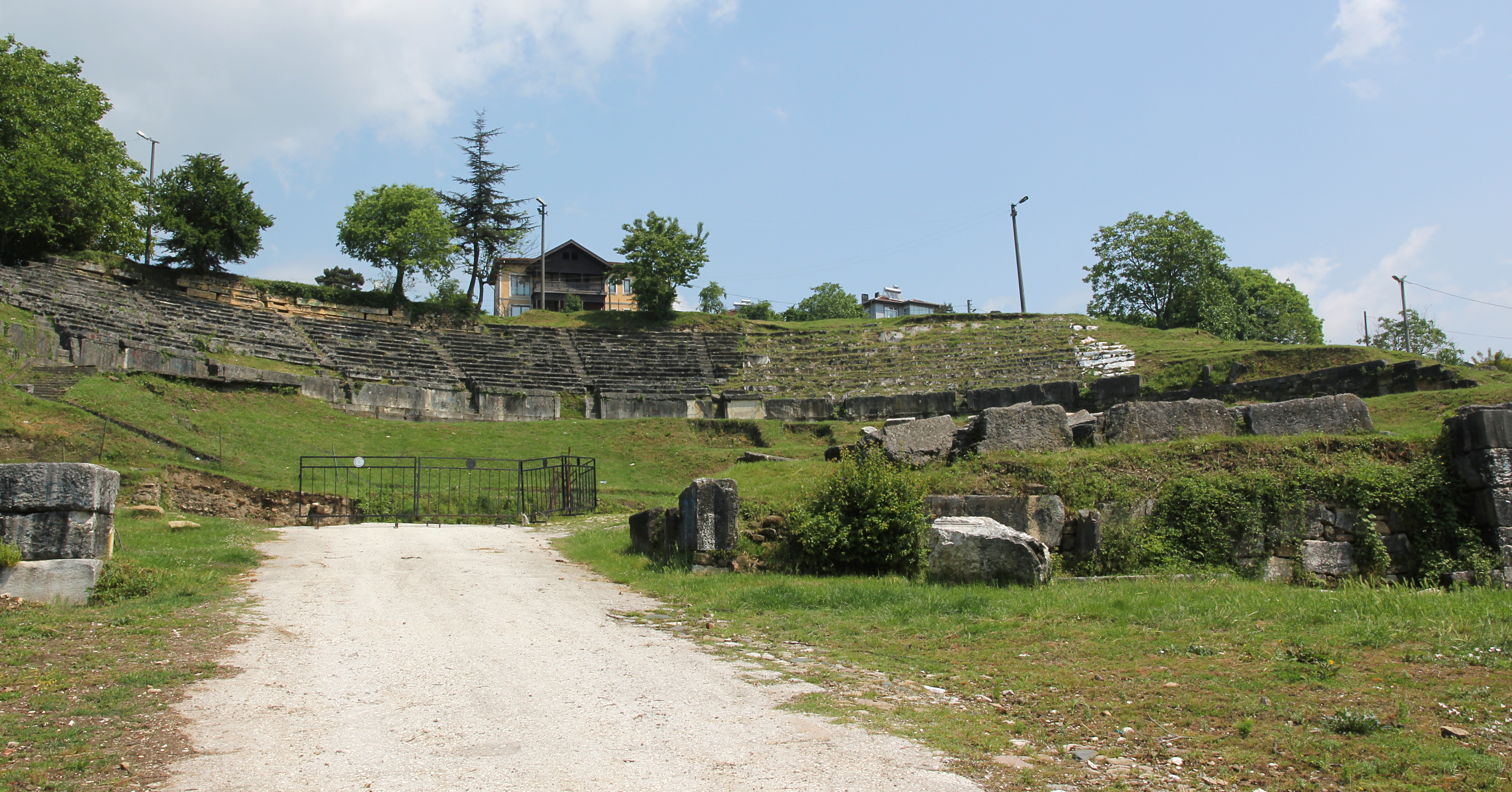
Theatre

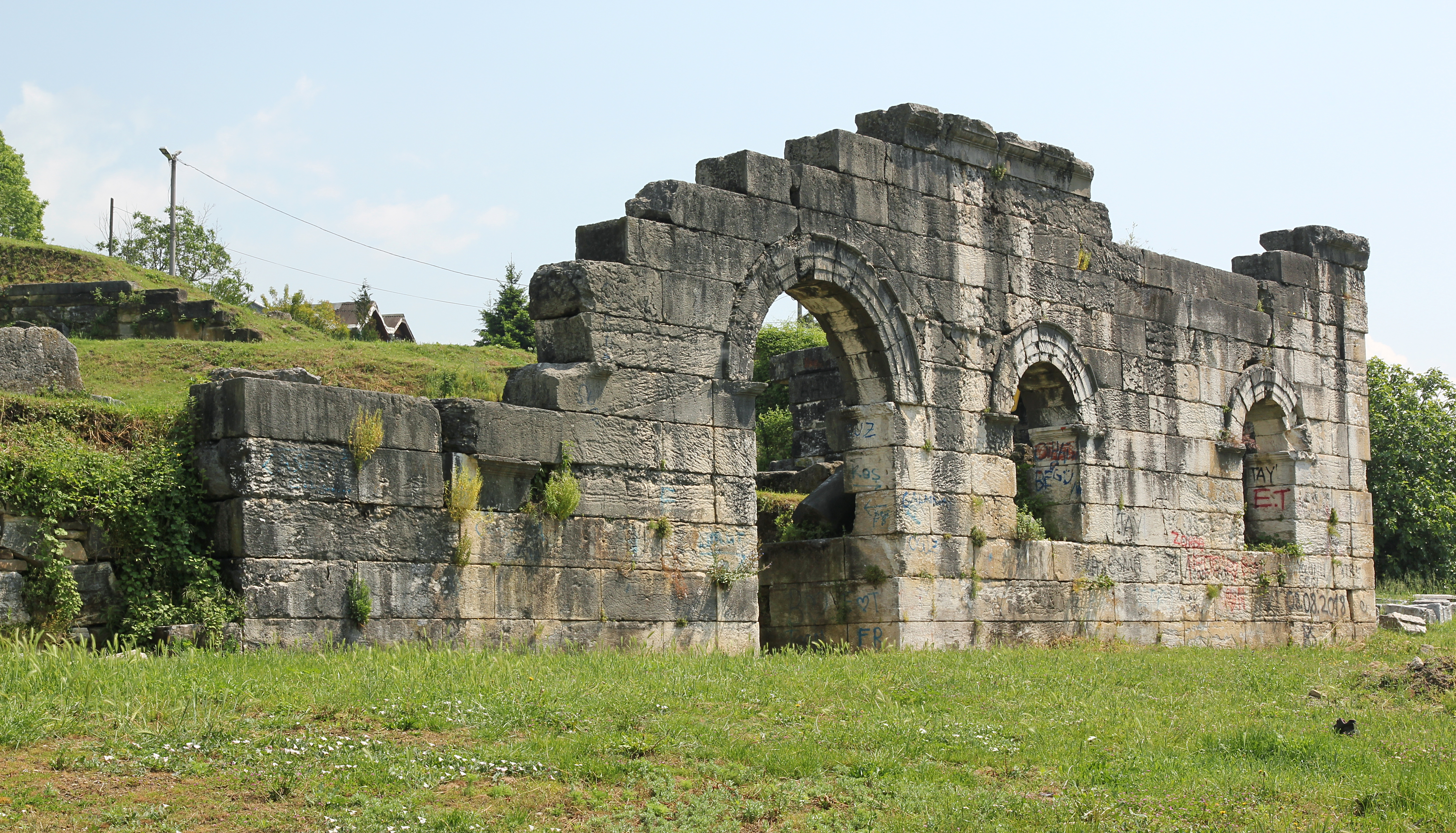
Scaenae frons, the background stage building of the theatre

The theatre, which is locally called "The Forty Stairs", was built in the city center during the Hellenistic period (300–30 BC) and was expanded in the Roman period (30 BC-300 AD). The theatre, with the dimensions of 100 m × 74 m (328 ft × 243 ft), covers an area of 5,978 m^{2} (64,350 sq ft). The cavea stands on the hillside and is oriented southward. It had a capacity of 10,000 spectators with 36 seating rows in three caveas separated by aisles; only 17 rows in the lower section and 15 rows in the upper section are preserved today. The sides of the seating rows at the radial aisles are decorated with Alchemilla figures.

The scaenae, the theatre stage, has a rectangular plan. Two arched windows and an arched door of the scaenae frons as well as the parodoi stand firmly on the exterior of the stage. The theatre is dated to the period between Hellenistic and Roman since the entrance on the stage is not common in ancient Greek theatre architecture. The cavea was constructed in the 1st century, and the scaenae was added in 190 AD.

In 2023, archaeologists have found at the theater a statue of Medusa, a statue of Apollo, the head of a statue of Alexander the Great and in a room located at the top of the theater a mosaic, which they called it the "Lion Mosaic".

In 2024, archaeologists uncovered terracotta pipes south of the theater's stage that were part of a 4th-century A.D. water system, as well as remains of a Byzantine church with an east-west apse. In addition, they found a narthex channel that was part of an ancient aqueduct carrying spring water from the theater's slope to a nearby fountain.

=== Roman bridge ===
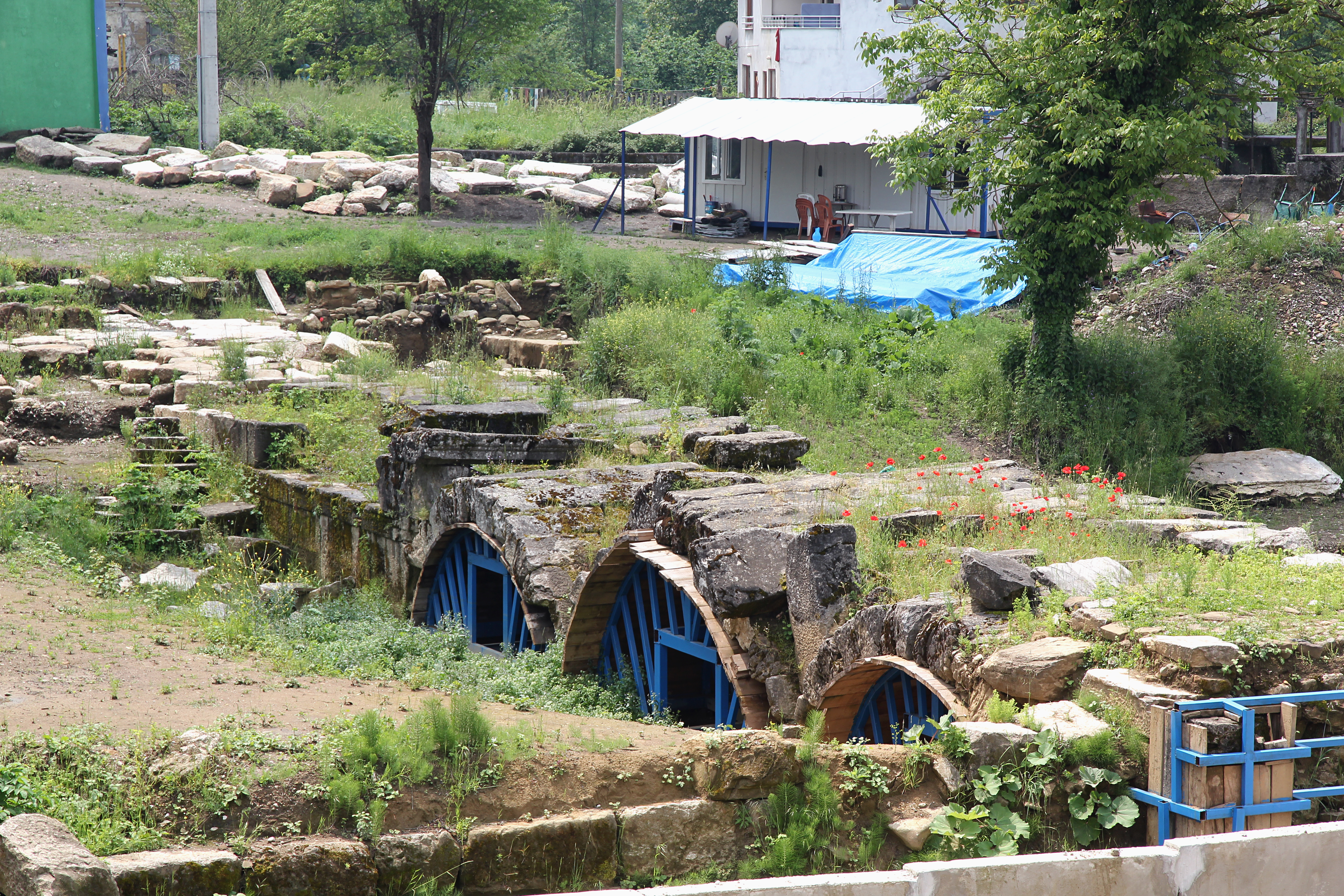
The "Roman bridge" under reconstruction

A 74 BC-built 10 m (33 ft)-long three-arched bridge is located outside the city walls in the west, crossing the river Hypius (modern-day "Melen" is one of the oldest intact bridges in Turkey built by the Roman Empire). The total length of the "Roman bridge" is 30.25 m (99.2 ft). It is 4.80 m (15.7 ft) wide and 3.17 m (10.4 ft) high. It is made of white marble blocks without using any mortar. The original length of the bridge was 39.20 m (128.6 ft). The restoration of the bridge, after a flood ruined its pavement, was completed in 2019.

=== Colonnaded street ===
A colonnaded street running between the city and the Roman bridge was discovered in 1974 during construction works for an irrigation canal in the southern section of the Düzce-Akçakoca highway D-655. Some architectural elements, such as the architrave, column fragments, vaulted blocks, and arches are deposited in the Konuralp Museum.

=== Kemerkasım Aqueduct ===
This is an aqueduct located at the nearby Kemerkasım village. In the beginning of the 2nd century AD, P. Domitius Iulianus helped out financially to bring water to the city, and in the 3rd century a nobleman, Gavinius Sacerdos, financially supported the water system. Eleven retaining legs from the old water system of the city, the Kemerkasım Aqueduct, have survived to the present day. The aqueduct was made of rubble stone.

=== Necroplis ===
The necropolis of the ancient city, a large, designed cemetery of Roman period with elaborate tomb monuments, is located on three hills in the Şehit Hüseyin Kıl neighborhood of Konuralp. It covers an area of 173,697 m^{2} (1,869,660 sq ft). Artifacts found at this site, such as a garlanded sarcophagus, a Roman period statue, steles, block stones, and earthenware pieces, are exhibited in the Konuralp Museum.

== Konuralp Museum ==
The nearby Konuralp Museum was established in 2003 to preserve the cultural heritage of the ancient city of Prusias ad Hypium. It contains a total of 6,237 artifacts including 1,848 archaeological, 491 ethnographic, and 3,898 coins.

Tyche statue

A statue of Tyche, the presiding tutelary deity, who governed the fortune and prosperity of a city, was uncovered in 1931. The original statue, dated to 4th century AD, is exhibited after restoration in the Istanbul Archaeology Museums, and a copy of it is in the Konuralp Museum.

Floor mosaics

A floor mosaic depicting Orpheus, a legendary musician, poet, and prophet in ancient Greek religion, with the Seasons was unearthed in the south of the ancient city in 1998. After restoration works, it was placed in the museum.

In 2016, another floor mosaic was unearthed inside a villa ruin, dated back to the Roman period of 300–400 AD, at Aynalı village about 3 km (1.9 mi) from the ancient city. It depicts Achilles, a hero of the Trojan War, and his mother Thetis.

Garland sarcophagus

A large garlanded sarcophagus was found in the necropolis situated in the hill west of Konuralp in 1937. The long sides of the sarcophagus are decorated with reliefs of garlanded bucrania. Its lower part features reliefs of several animals like pigs, lions, eagles, and fishing birds.

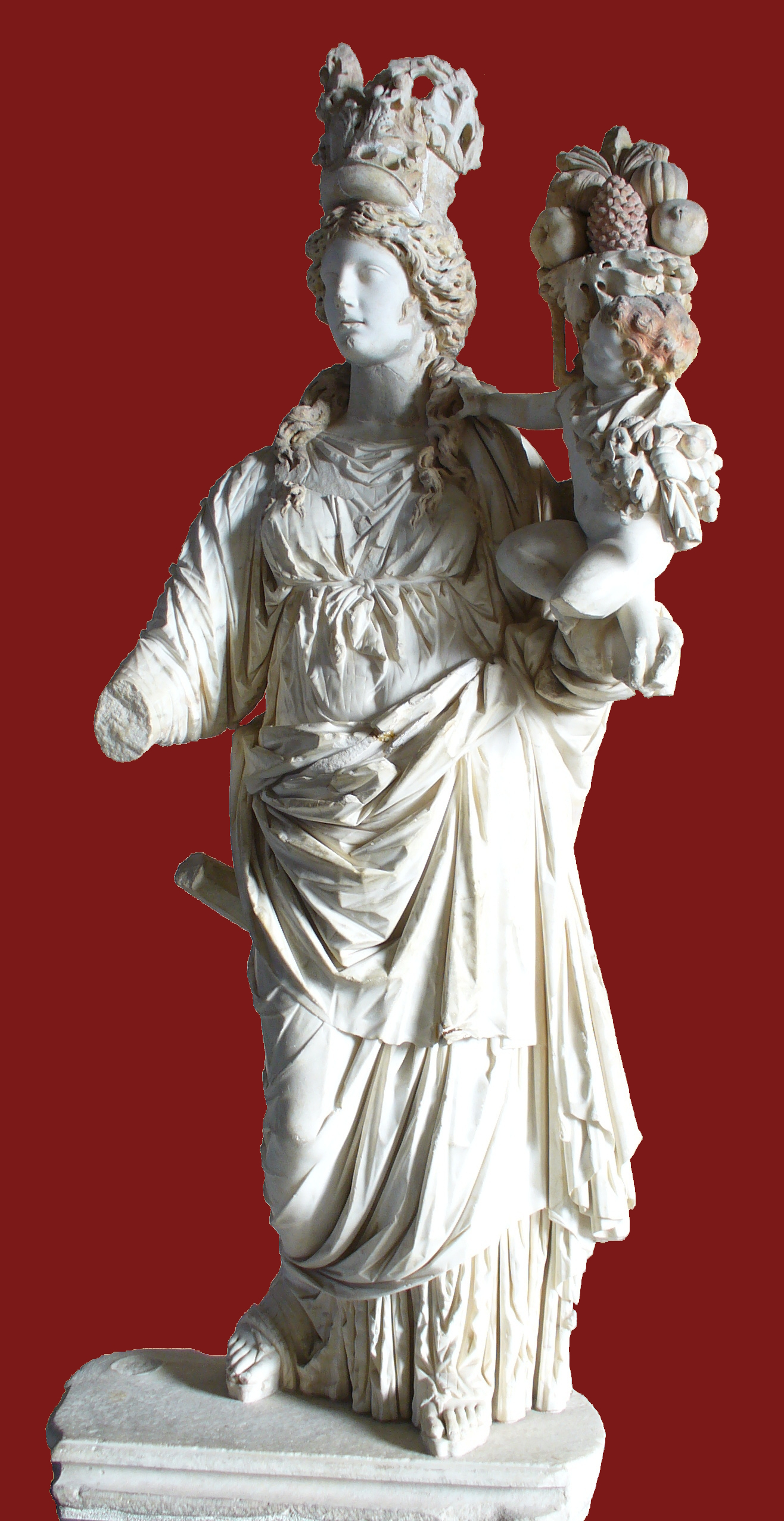
Statue of goddess Tyche

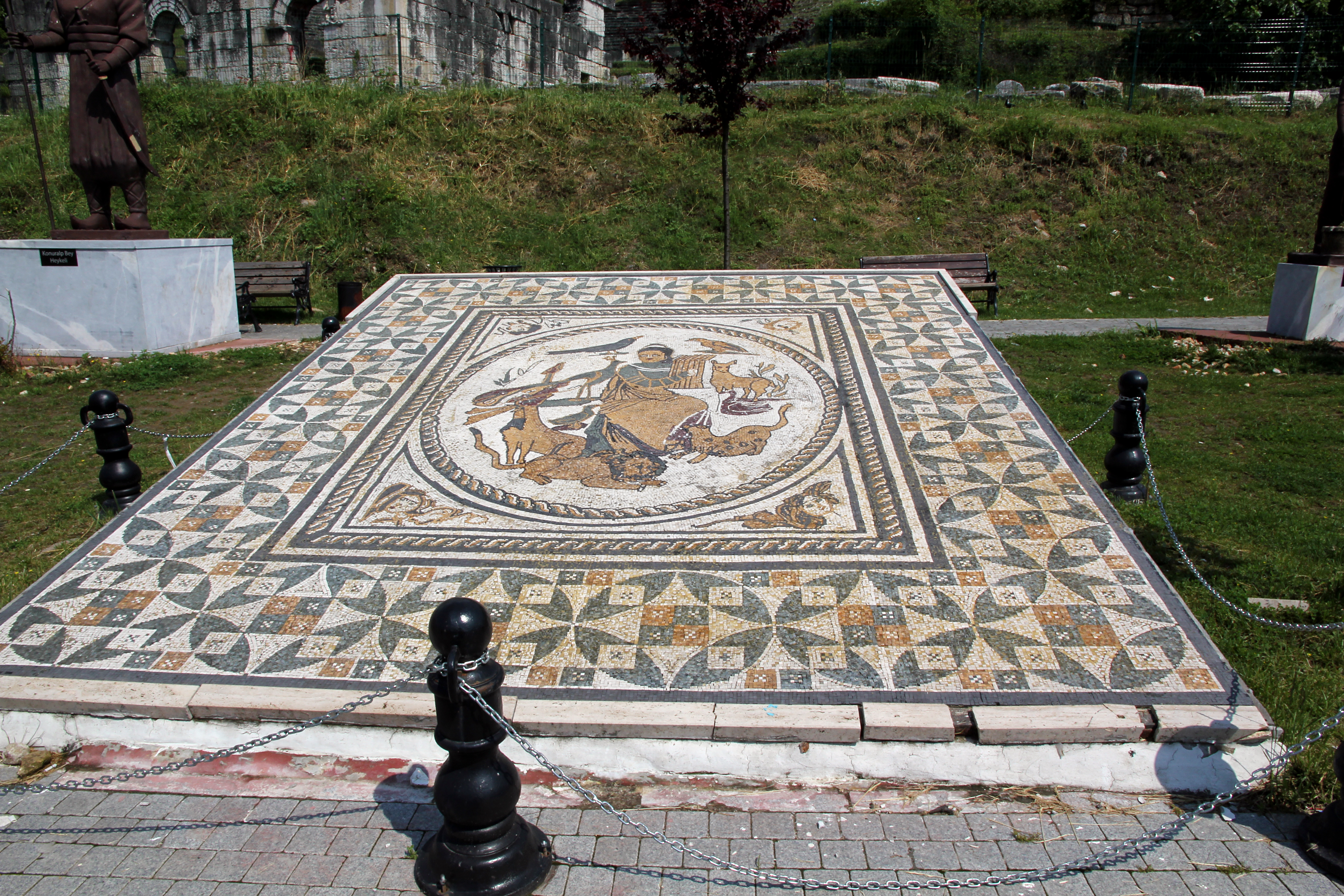
"Orpheus" mosaic

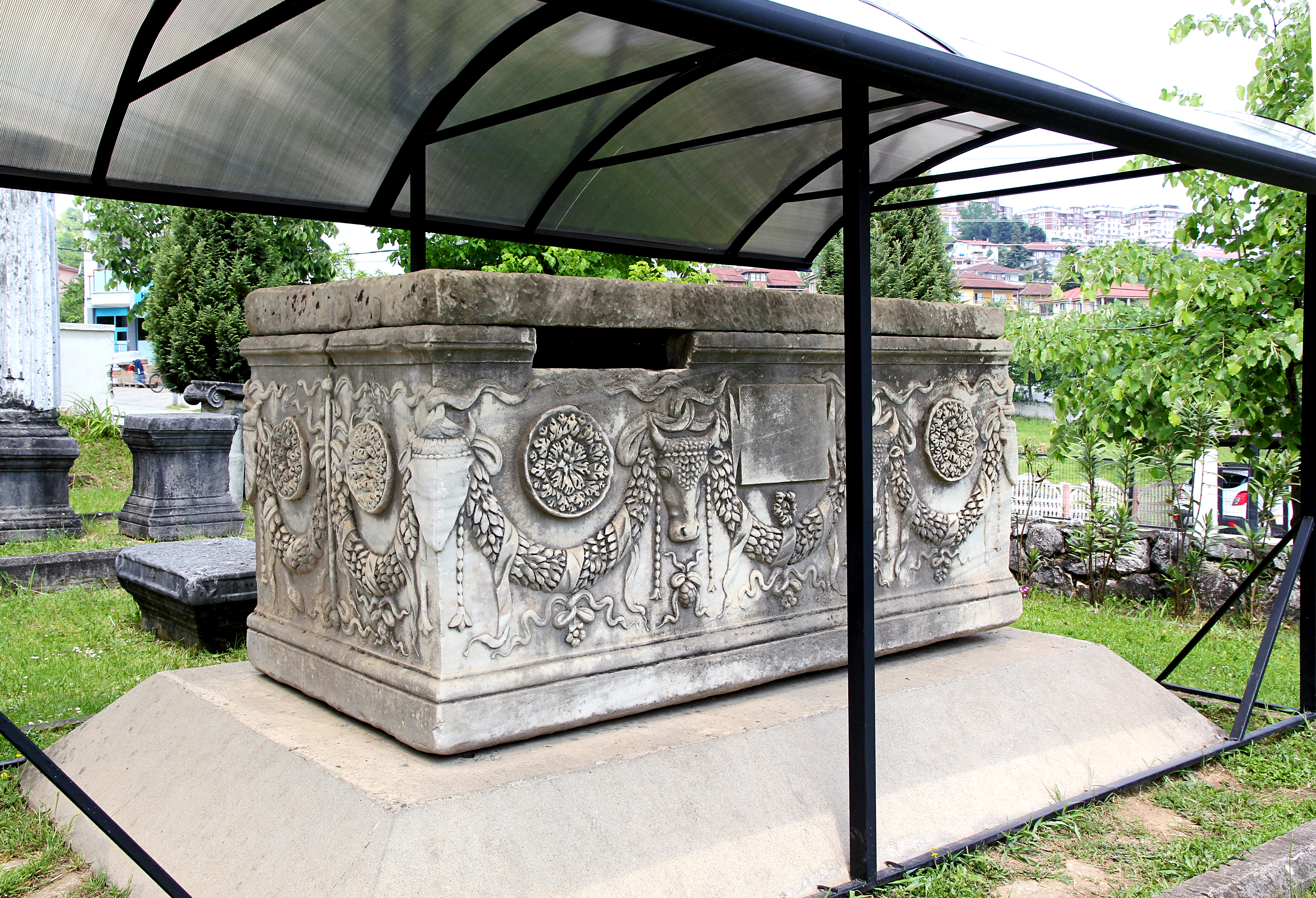
Garland sarcophagus in the Konuralp Museum, Turkey

== Bishops ==
The city became a bishopric in the 4th century. Bishop Georgios attended the First Council of Nicaea in 325 AD, and Bishop Olympios took part at the Council of Chalcedon (451 AD).

Several of its bishops are known:

- Georgios (not Hesychius, as Le Quien says), 325
- Olympios in 451
- Dometius in 681
- Theophilios in 787
- Constantine in 869
- Leo in 879
- St. Paul, martyred by the iconoclasts in the ninth century

It is not known when this bishopric disappeared; it still existed in the tenth century. No longer the seat of a residential bishop, it remains a titular see of the Roman Catholic Church.
