= Lityerses =

Son of Midas in Greek mythology

In Greek mythology, Lityerses (Ancient Greek: Λιτυέρσης) or Lytierses (Ancient Greek: Λυτιέρσης) was an illegitimate son of Midas (or of Comis) dwelling in Celaenae, Phrygia.

== Mythology ==
Lityerses was a talented swordsman, and was bloodthirsty and aggressive. He challenged people to harvesting contests and beheaded those he beat, putting the rest of their bodies in the sheaves. Heracles won the contest and killed him, then threw his body into the river Maeander. He was also known as the "Reaper of Men." One source describes him as a glutton who could eat "three asses' panniers" of food and drink "a ten-amphora cask" of wine at a time.

The Phrygian reapers used to celebrate his memory in a harvest-song which bore the name of Lityerses. The Phrygians' song for Lityerses was, according to one tradition, a comic version of the Mariandyni's lament sung for Bormus.

Theocritus in his tenth Idyll gives a specimen of a Greek harvest-song addressed to Demeter, called 'the Song of the Divine Lityerses'. In this song, there is no mention of the legend; it is merely an ordinary reaping-song.

== In written stories ==
- In The Lost Hero, a resurrected Lityerses meets Jason Grace, Piper McLean and Leo Valdez and tries to kill them. However they escape and Lityerses is turned to gold due to a mistake of his father, King Midas. Jason throws a rug on the statue to keep him from being freed.
- In The Dark Prophecy, Lityerses is shown to be working under Commodus who is a part of the evil god emperors, Triumvirate Holdings, having been freed by Commodus. However, after Apollo saves him from execution by the hands of Commodus, he helps Apollo throughout the book and chooses to live at the Waystation.
- In The Tower of Nero, Lit is mentioned to have settled in well and to be running an elephant visitation program at the Waystation.
