= Düzce =

- Municipality
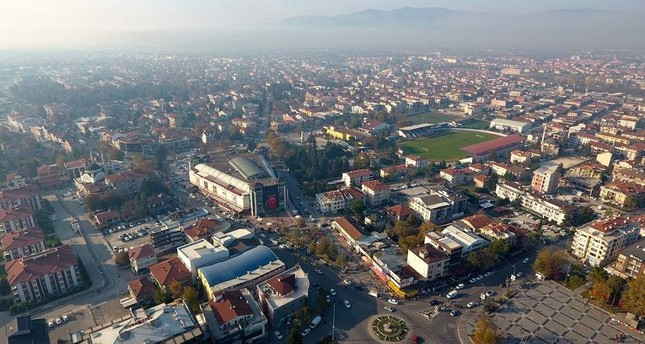
- Düzce panoramic view

- Coat of arms

- Location within Turkey
- Coordinates: 40°50′30″N 31°09′30″E
- Country: Turkey
- Province: Düzce
- District: Düzce

Government
  - Mayor: Faruk Özlü (AKP)
- Population (2022): 194,097
- Time zone: UTC+3 (TRT)
- Area code: 0380
- Climate: Cfa
- Website: duzce.bel.tr

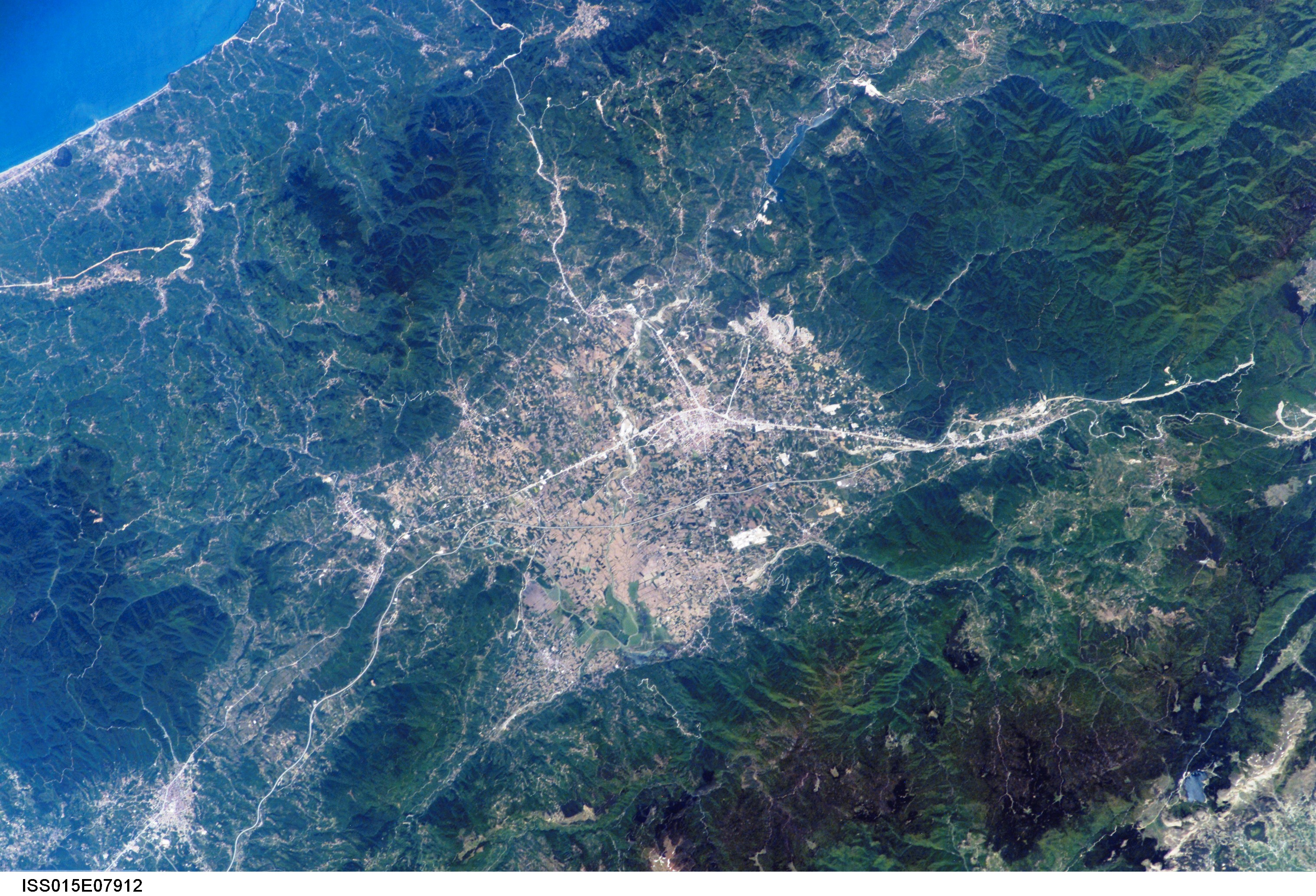
Aerial view of Düzce (2007)

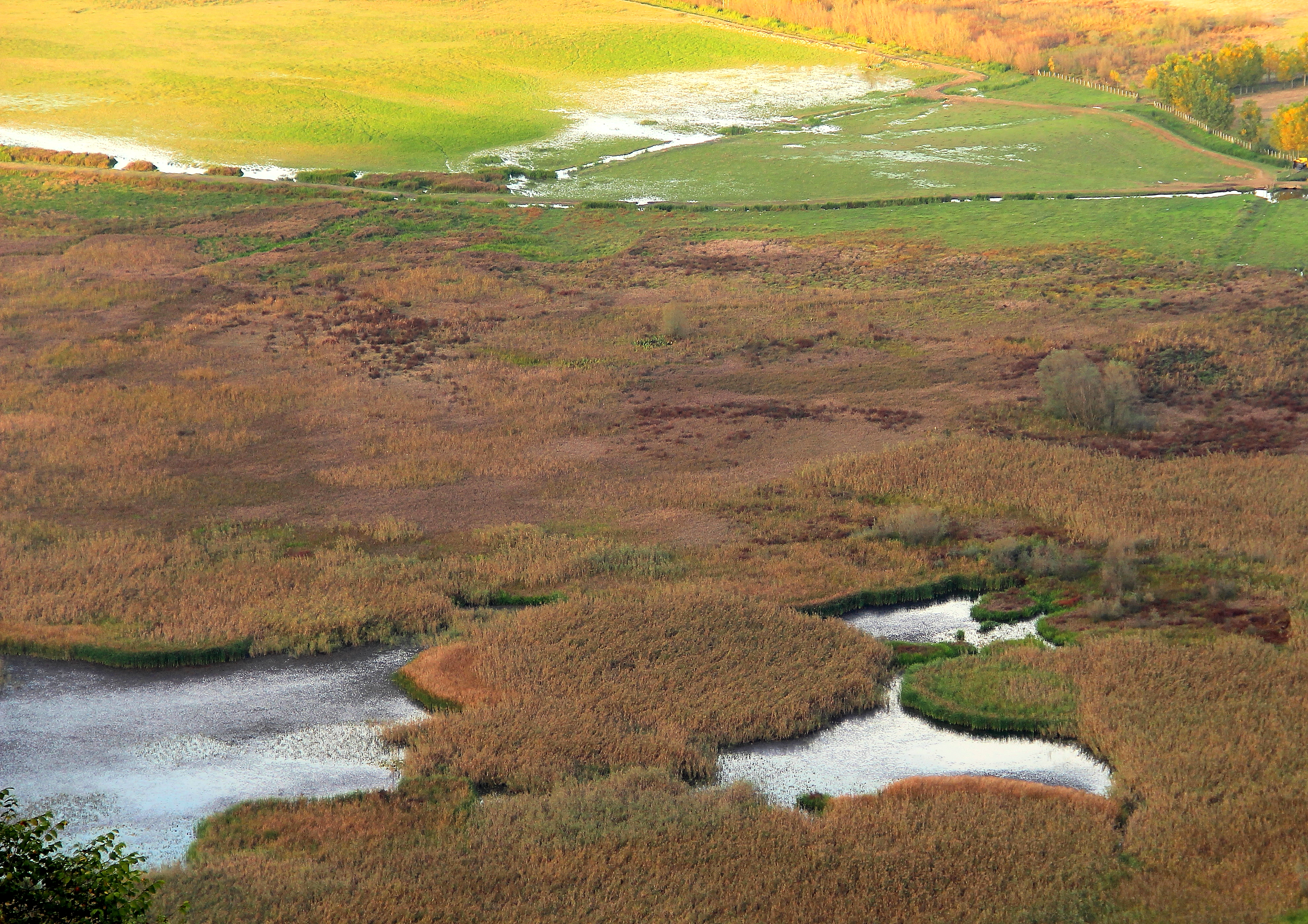
Efteni Lake near Düzce

Düzce (Turkish pronunciation: [dyz'dʒe]) is a city in northwestern Turkey, the capital city of Düzce Province, the eighty-first province in the country. It is the seat of Düzce District. Its population is 194,097 (as of 2022).

== Overview ==
Düzce is the eighty-first and the newest province of Turkey. It is situated on the Black Sea between the capital Ankara and Istanbul. It was greatly affected by both the Marmara and Düzce earthquakes of 1999.

Ankara is 240 km to the east and Istanbul is 228 km to the west. Road D-100 passes through Düzce, while the TEM highway passes around it.

Düzce is in the North East of the East Marmara region. It is bordered to the west by Sakarya, to the northeast by Zonguldak, and to the east by Bolu. It opens to the Black Sea with the valley of Büyük Melen on the northwest. Düzce is 23 km across from east to west, and 20 km from north to south.

Nearby are also some tourist centers and popular attractions such as Abant, Kartalkaya, Yedigoller, Golcuk and Akcakoca.

The main agricultural products in Düzce are tobacco, maize wheat, nut and many kinds of wheat and vegetables.

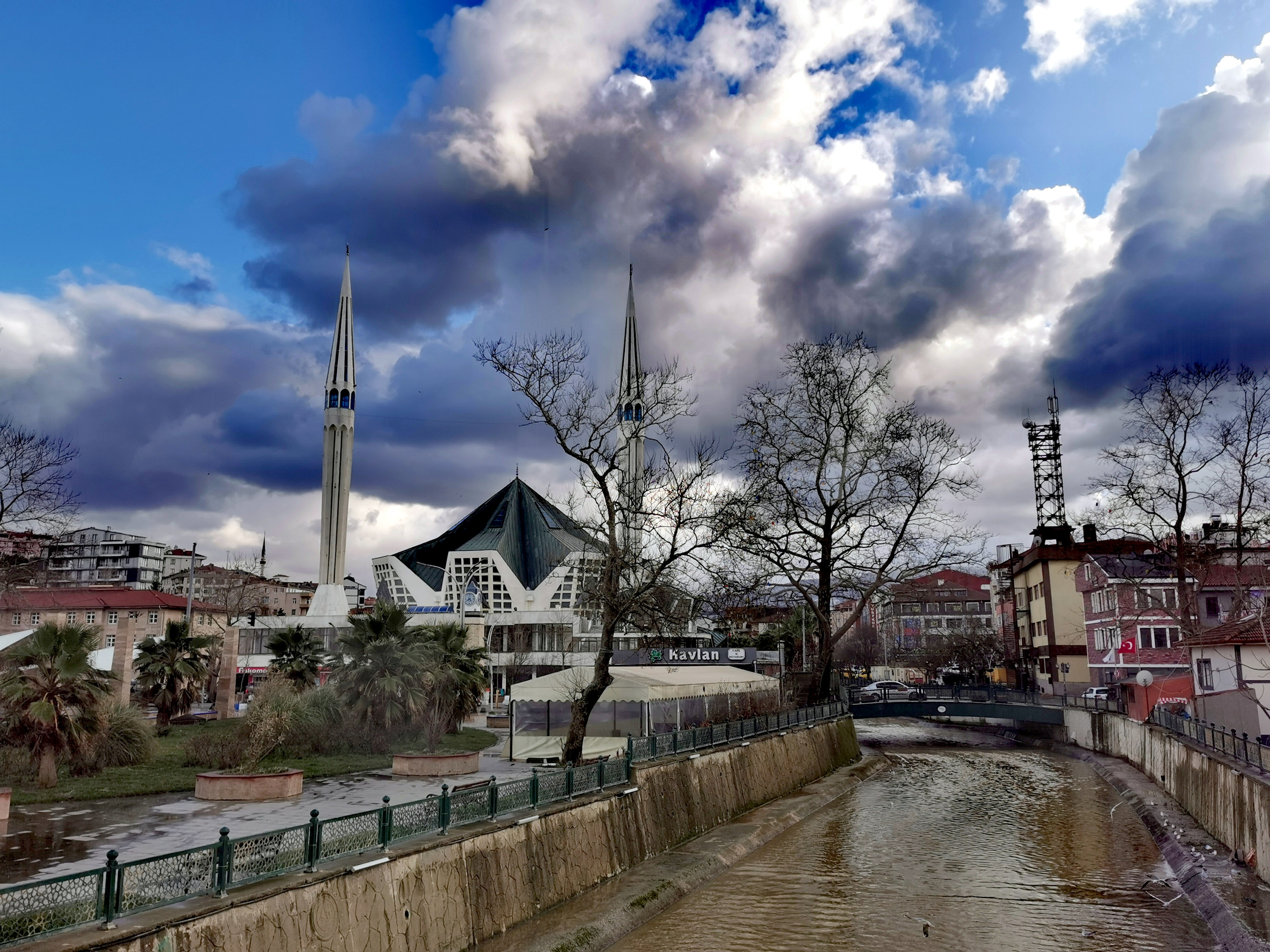
Akcakoca Central Mosque in Düzce city center

== History ==
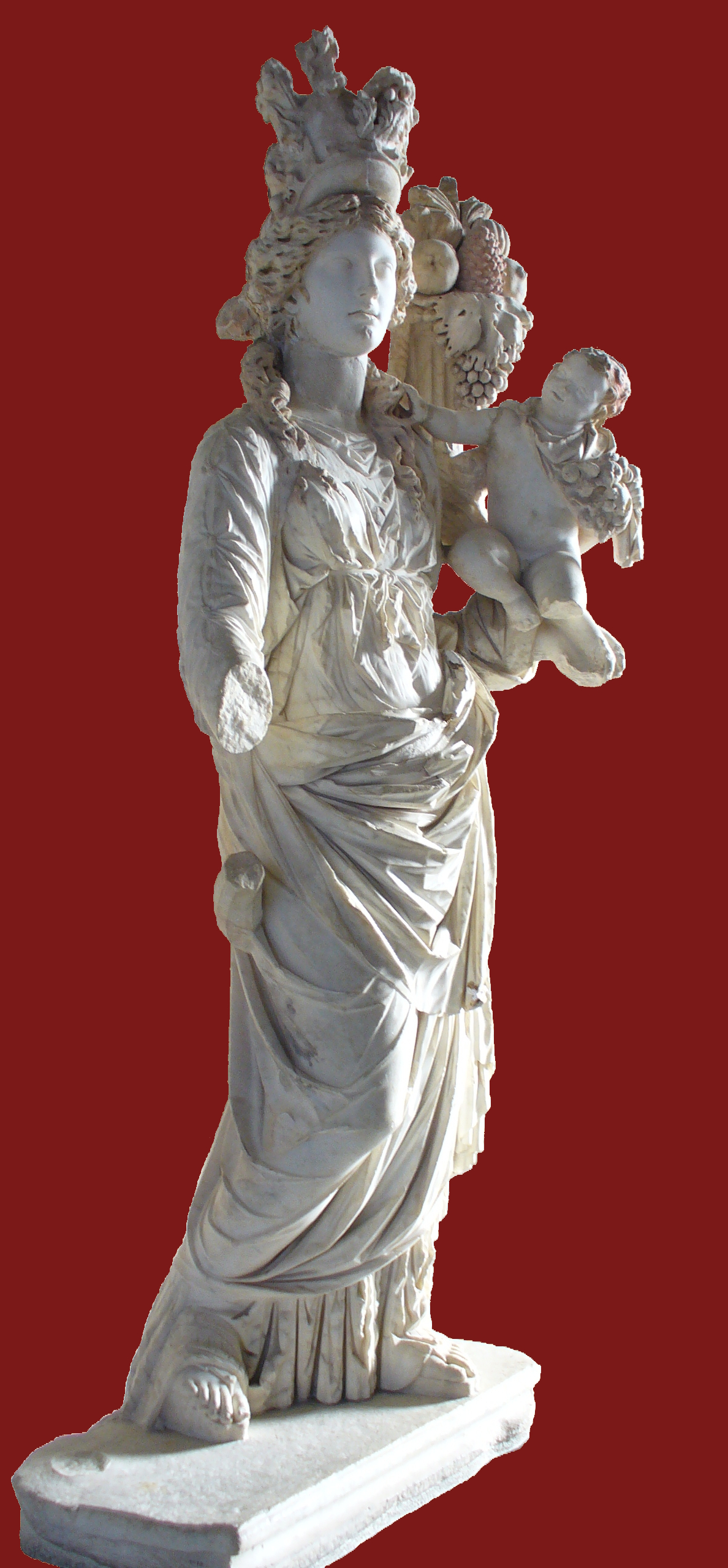
The goddess Tyche holding in her arms Plutus (god of wealth) as a child. Hellenistic art, Roman period, 2nd century AD. Located in the Istanbul Archaeology Museum From Prusias ad Hypium (in the present-day il of Düzce).

Historical Konuralp is 8 km north of Düzce; the first settlements there go back to 3rd century BC. Until 74 BC, it was one of the most important cities belonging to Bithynia, which included Bilecik, Bolu, Sakarya, Kocaeli. It was conquered by Pontus and then by the Roman Empire. During the Roman period, the city was influenced by Latin culture, and it changed its name to Prusias ad Hypium. Later on, Christianity affected the city and after the separation of the Roman Empire in 395, it was controlled by the Eastern Roman Empire (the later Byzantine Empire).

In 1204, the Crusader armies invaded Constantinople, establishing the Latin Empire. Düzce and its surroundings are thought to have been under the dominance of the Latin Empire during this period. Düzce was under Byzantine rule again from 1261 to 1323.

Konuralp Bey, one of Osman Gazi's commanders, was ordered to conquer Düzce and its surroundings to expand Ottoman lands. The first Ottoman administrators in Düzce were Konuralp Bey, Sungur Bey, Semsi Bey and Gunduz Alp.

During the Ottoman Empire, Düzce provided navy timber, and it became an important centre of transportation between Istanbul and cities further east, such as Sivas and Erzurum.

During the rule of Sultan Abdulaziz and Abdulmecit, immigrants from the Caucasus, the Pontic coast, Transcaucasia and the Balkans increased the population of Düzce. The government provided them free land. It had 137 villages and 66,618 homes with a population of 36,088 during the rule of Abdulmecit II.

In the late 19th and the early 20th century, Düzce was part of the Kastamonu Vilayet of the Ottoman Empire.

After the establishment of the republic, the city rapidly industrialized. The main economic sectors are forestry production, automotive parts, textile, hunting and sports guns, cement, pharmaceutical products, nuts and tobacco.

It was hit by a series of earthquakes in this period, such as the 1944 Düzce earthquake, 1957 Abant earthquake, 1967 Adapazari earthquake, and in 1999, it was destroyed by the 17 August Izmit earthquake and the earthquake on 12 November 1999. The magnitude of the earthquake was 7.2 (Richter magnitude scale) and lasted for 30 seconds, killing 845 people and injuring over 5,000. To quickly rebuild the earthquake damaged areas, the Council of Ministers made Düzce the 81st province of Turkey in 1999.

== Climate ==
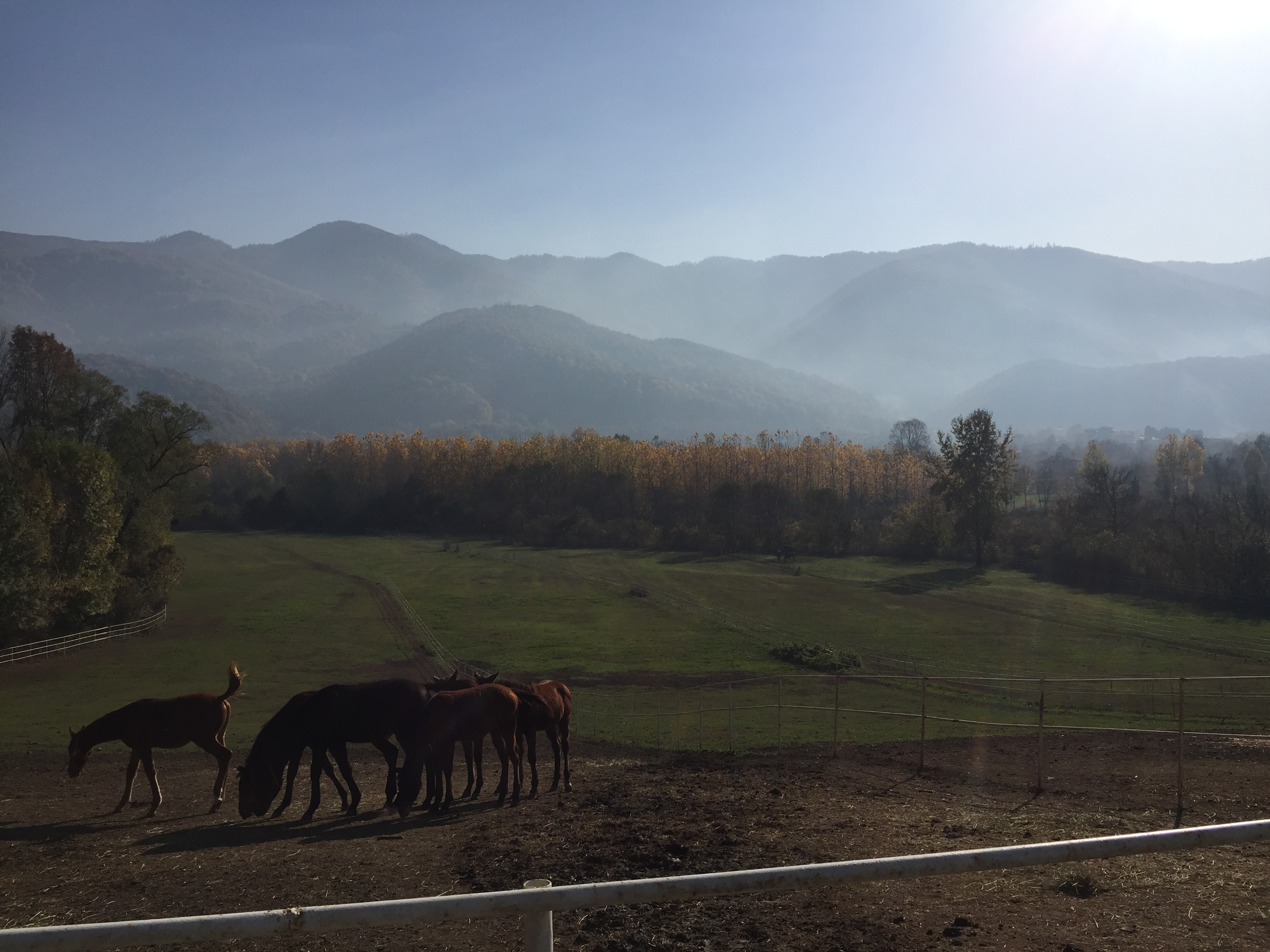
A view from Düzce

Düzce has a humid subtropical climate (Cfa) under the Köppen climate classification, and an oceanic climate (Do) under the Trewartha climate classification. It experiences chilly, occasionally snowy winters and warm to very warm summers.

According to the Köppen climate classification, at the turn of the century, Düzce was still considered to have an oceanic climate (Cfb), with its warmest month being below the 22 °C threshold, yet in recent decades climate change and global warming has been contributing to its classification in slowly turning humid subtropical (Cfa).

Highest recorded temperature: 42.4 °C (108.3 °F) in 13 July 2000
Lowest recorded temperature: −20.5 °C (−4.9 °F) in 22 January 1967

Climate data for Düzce (1991–2020, extremes 1959–2023)
| Month | Jan | Feb | Mar | Apr | May | Jun | Jul | Aug | Sep | Oct | Nov | Dec | Year |
|---|---|---|---|---|---|---|---|---|---|---|---|---|---|
| Record high °C (°F) | 26.1 (79.0) | 26.9 (80.4) | 32.2 (90.0) | 34.7 (94.5) | 39.5 (103.1) | 39.0 (102.2) | 42.4 (108.3) | 42.0 (107.6) | 38.7 (101.7) | 38.2 (100.8) | 31.3 (88.3) | 29.2 (84.6) | 42.4 (108.3) |
| Mean daily maximum °C (°F) | 8.7 (47.7) | 11.2 (52.2) | 14.3 (57.7) | 19.3 (66.7) | 23.9 (75.0) | 27.5 (81.5) | 29.7 (85.5) | 30.0 (86.0) | 26.5 (79.7) | 21.5 (70.7) | 15.9 (60.6) | 10.3 (50.5) | 19.9 (67.8) |
| Daily mean °C (°F) | 4.1 (39.4) | 5.5 (41.9) | 8.2 (46.8) | 12.3 (54.1) | 17.0 (62.6) | 20.8 (69.4) | 23.1 (73.6) | 23.2 (73.8) | 19.3 (66.7) | 14.8 (58.6) | 9.5 (49.1) | 5.6 (42.1) | 13.6 (56.5) |
| Mean daily minimum °C (°F) | 0.8 (33.4) | 1.5 (34.7) | 3.7 (38.7) | 7.1 (44.8) | 11.5 (52.7) | 15.2 (59.4) | 17.4 (63.3) | 17.8 (64.0) | 13.9 (57.0) | 10.3 (50.5) | 5.3 (41.5) | 2.3 (36.1) | 8.9 (48.0) |
| Record low °C (°F) | −20.5 (−4.9) | −17.3 (0.9) | −13.6 (7.5) | −3.0 (26.6) | 0.4 (32.7) | 6.6 (43.9) | 8.8 (47.8) | 7.6 (45.7) | 4.5 (40.1) | −1.2 (29.8) | −6.8 (19.8) | −16.5 (2.3) | −20.5 (−4.9) |
| Average precipitation mm (inches) | 87.1 (3.43) | 70.7 (2.78) | 77.1 (3.04) | 60.6 (2.39) | 61.5 (2.42) | 76.7 (3.02) | 39.3 (1.55) | 51.1 (2.01) | 52.7 (2.07) | 82.8 (3.26) | 67.6 (2.66) | 95.7 (3.77) | 822.9 (32.40) |
| Average precipitation days | 15.23 | 14.4 | 14.7 | 12.2 | 12.33 | 10.43 | 6.43 | 5.83 | 8.5 | 11.63 | 11 | 15.63 | 138.3 |
| Average snowy days | 6.09 | 2.91 | 1.64 | 0.18 | 0 | 0 | 0 | 0 | 0 | 0 | 0.27 | 2.82 | 13.91 |
| Average relative humidity (%) | 81.8 | 76.3 | 72.9 | 71 | 71.7 | 71 | 71 | 71.8 | 74.6 | 79.9 | 80.8 | 82.9 | 75.5 |
| Mean monthly sunshine hours | 54.6 | 80.5 | 115.0 | 156.6 | 206.2 | 243.2 | 271.9 | 252.6 | 191.4 | 133.7 | 84.0 | 48.0 | 1,826.8 |
| Mean daily sunshine hours | 1.9 | 3.0 | 3.8 | 5.4 | 6.8 | 8.2 | 8.8 | 8.2 | 6.4 | 4.4 | 2.9 | 1.7 | 5.1 |
Source 1: Turkish State Meteorological Service
Source 2: NCEI(humidity, sun 1991-2020), Meteomanz (snowy days 2014-2024)

== Sister cities ==
- Novi Pazar
- East Riding of Yorkshire
- Dubrovnik
- Sainshand

== Sports ==
- Düzcespor
