= Hypius =

River in Turkey

Coordinates: 41°04′19″N 30°58′09″E

Hypius or Hypios (Ancient Greek: Ὕπιος), also Hyppius or Hyppios (Ὕππιος), was a river of ancient Bithynia, not far westward from the Sangarius River. The river itself is very small; but at its mouth it is so broad that the greater part of the fleet of Mithridates was enabled to take up its winter quarters in it. According to the Periplus of Pseudo-Scylax, this river formed the boundary between the territories of the Bithyni and the Mariandyni.

It is identified with the modern Büyük Melen Su in Asiatic Turkey.
