= Mariandyni =

Ancient tribe in the north-east of Bithynia

The Mariandyni (Ancient Greek: Μαριανδυνοί or Μαρυανδυνοί) were a tribe of Thracian origin in the north-east of Bithynia. Their country was called Mariandynia (Μαριανδυνία, Stephanus of Byzantium s. v.) and Pliny speaks of a Sinus Mariandynus ("Mariandynian Gulf") on their coast. Greek myths have Mariandynus as their presumed eponymous hero.

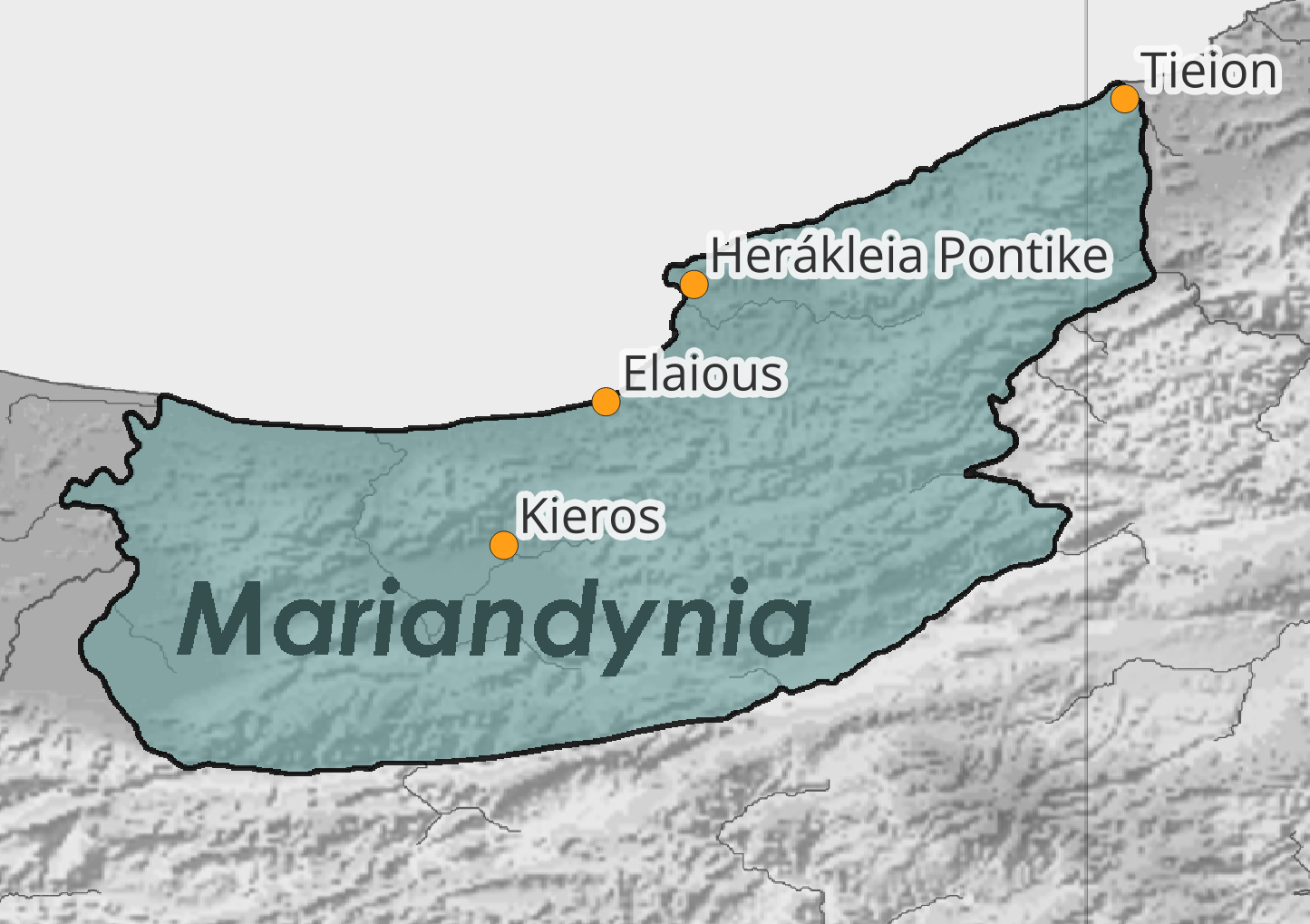
Map of classical Mariandynia, showing the region's extent and principal settlements: Herakleia Pontike, Elaious, Kieros, and Tieion.

The Mariandyni lived in the Kingdom of Bithynia, in the region between the Sangarius and Billaeus Rivers, east of the lands inhabited by Thracian tribes called Thyni and Bithyni. According to Scylax of Caryanda, they did not extend as far west as the Sangarius, for according to him the river Hypius formed the boundary between the Bithyni and Mariandyni.

Ancient sources are vague as to the ethnic affiliation of the Mariandyni. Strabo expresses a belief that the Mariandyni were a branch of the Bithynians, a belief which cannot be well reconciled with the statement of Herodotus, who clearly distinguishes the Mariandyni from the Thracians or Thyni in Asia Minor. Elsewhere, Strabo states that Mariandyni are Paphlagonians. The descriptions provided by Herodotus suggest that in the Persian army they appeared quite distinct from the Bithyni, and their armor resembled that of the Paphlagonians, which was quite different from that of the Bithyni.

The chief city in their territory was Heraclea Pontica, the inhabitants of which reduced the Mariandyni, for a time, to a state of servitude resembling that of the Cretan Mnoae, or the Thessalian Penestae. According to modern researcher John Hind,

"...the Mariandyni may have initially ceded some coastal territory [to the Heracleot colonists] fairly peacefully, being in need of protection from... the Bebrykes and the Paphlagones. In time the Herakleots acquired the Lycus Valley as the basis of their prosperity, and the Mariandyni entered a form of collective serfdom in which the saving grace was that they could not be dispersed or sold abroad. How this state of affairs was arrived at is not clear, but the people may have been sold into it at a time of weakness by their chieftains, or may have slowly descended into it as a result of "being protected out of all they owned" by the Herakleots... The vigorous expansion of the Herakleot territory resulted in the locking of the Mariandyni into their agricultural villages as a dependent people, subject also to impressment as rowers in the fleet."

In the early 6th century they seem to still have been an independent people, paying tribute directly to Lydian king Croesus, and to have been at war with Heraclea. In the division of the Persian empire they formed part of the third Persian satrapy.

== Sources ==
- Hind, John. Megarian Colonization in the Western Half of the Black Sea (Sister- and Daughter Cities of Herakleia). In: Tsetskhladze, Gocha R. (ed.) The Greek Colonization of The Black Sea Area. Historical Interpretation of Archaeology. Stuttgart : Franz Steiner Verlag, 1998, pp. 131 – 152
