= Greek Tourism Confederation =

Greek tourism organization

- Σύνδεσμος Ελληνικών Τουριστικών Επιχειρήσεων (ΣΕΤΕ)
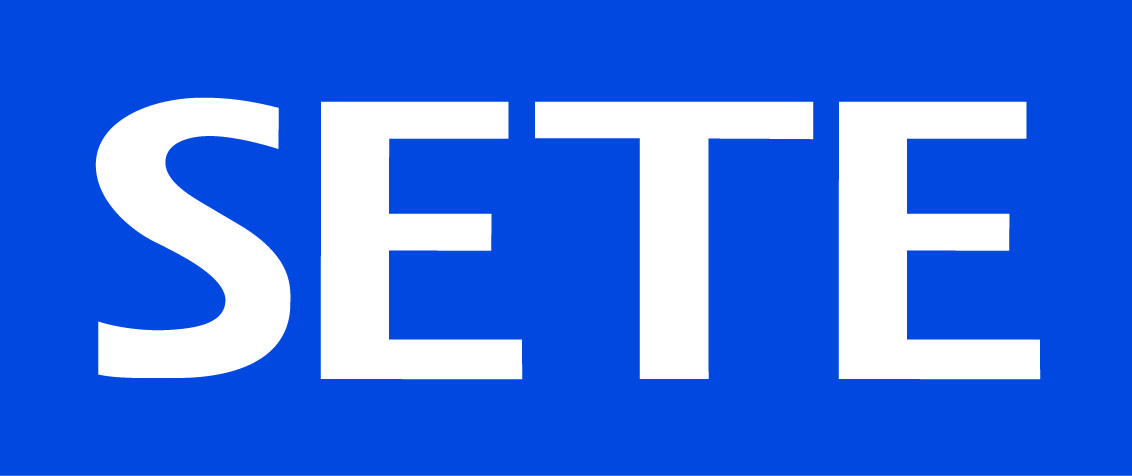
- Abbreviation: SETE
- Formation: 1991
- Headquarters: 34 Amalias Av. 105 58 Athens, Greece
- Location: Athens, Greece
- Coordinates: 37°58′18″N 23°44′00″E
- Fields: Greek Tourism
- President: Agapi Sbokou
- Website: sete.gr

The Greek Tourism Confederation (Greek: Σύνδεσμος Ελληνικών Τουριστικών Επιχειρήσεων), literally as Confederation of Greek Tourism Enterprises (SETE), commonly abbreviated to SETE (ΣΕΤΕ), is a non-governmental, non-profit organization and professional association founded in 1991. It is the representative confederation for unions of tourism enterprises in Greece, as well as independent companies operating across the broader tourism sector.

== History ==
The original 9 entrepreneurs who met in Elounda, Crete to discuss the creation of the association were: (1) Spyros Kokotos, of Elounda S.A. Hotels and Resorts, and first president of the Association, (2) Nikos Angelopoulos, of Aldemar Resorts, (3) Dia Capsis, of Capsis Hotels & Resorts, (4) Nikos Metaxas, of Maris Hotels, (5) Nikos Daskalandonakis, of Grecotel Hotels and Resorts, (6) Yannis Sbokos, of the Sbokos Hotels Group (7) Gina Mamidakis, of Bluegr Mamidakis Hotels, (8) Tasos Grigoriadis, of Chalkidiki hotels, (9) Stefanos Voulgaris, of Corfu hotel.

In order to fulfill the legal requirement of 20 members, the following 14 were added to the original group and became the 23 founding members of the Association: (1) Thedore Vassilakis, of Autohellas and Aegean Airlines, (2) Georgios Vernicos, of Vernicos Yachts, (3) Vassilis Konstandakopoulos, of Costamare Shipping and Navarino Resorts, (4) Dakis Ioannou, of J&P Overseas and Athenaum Intercontinental, (5) George Tsilidis, (6) Manolis Tsatsakis, (7) Konstantinos Koulouvatos, (8) Stelios Golemis, (9) Antonis Mousamas, (10) Maria Argyrou, (11) Manolis Papakaliatis, (12) Elias Kammenos, (13) Stelios Seferiades, formerly of Astir Hotels, (14) Constantine Mitsis, of Mitsis Hotels.

== Organizational aims ==
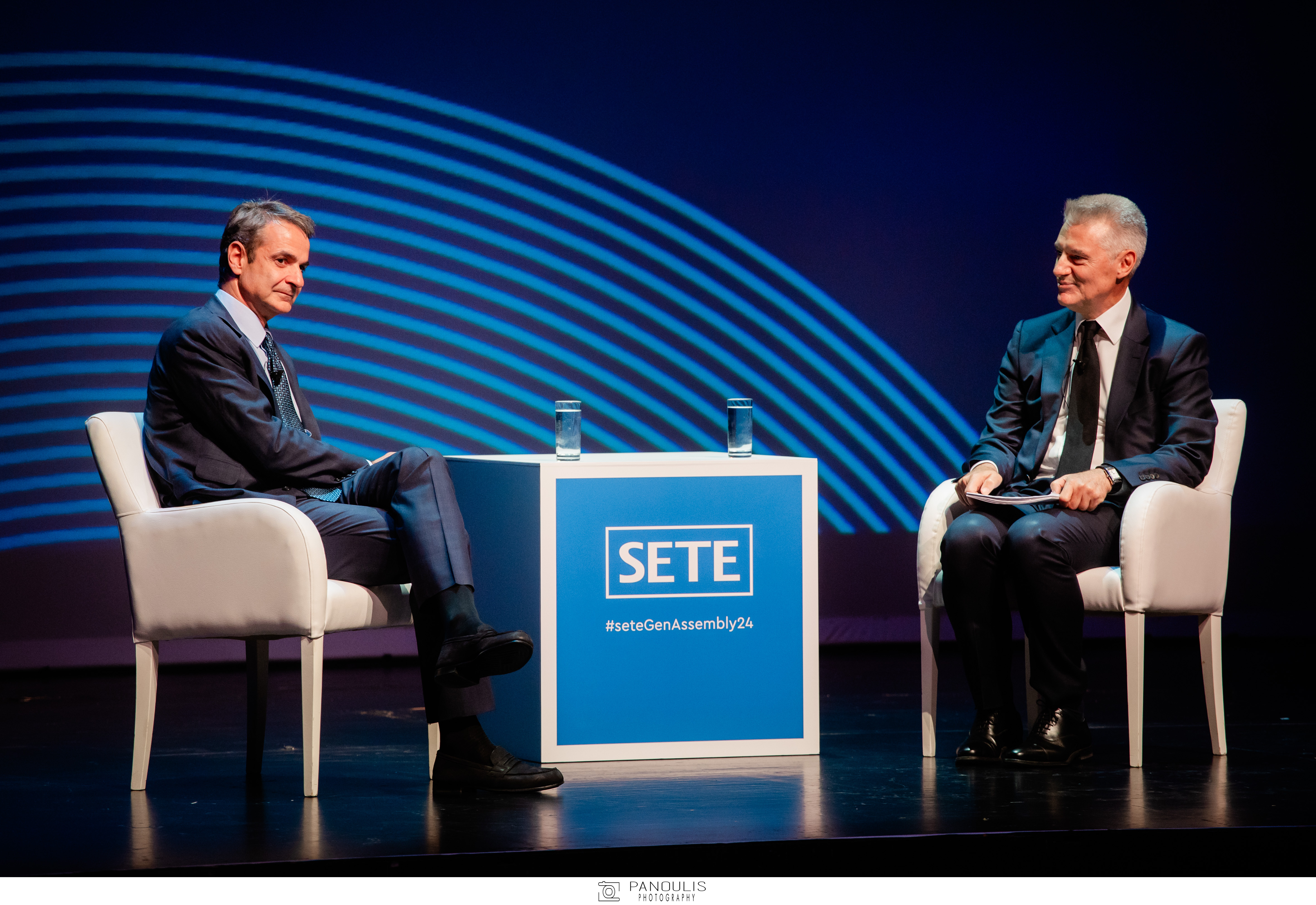
Former SETE President, Yannis Paraschis with Greek Prime Minister, Kyriakos Mitsotakis during SETE General Assembly 2024

SETE aims constantly at boosting competitiveness and demonstrating the key role of tourism in the Greek economy. More specifically, SETE:

- Underlines the impact of tourism on the economy, the society and the environment
- Informs the Government, the broader public sector and the business community regarding developments in the international tourism market
- Promotes co-operation between public and private sectors
- Represents its Members in national and international organizations
- Establishes platforms of collaboration among the various tourism branches and between tourism and other sectors of the economy
- Co-operates with Greek and international research centres in the fields of tourism and economy
- Aims for the creation and dissemination of tourism industry know how

== Activities ==
=== Research ===
SETE positions are based on continuous research, study and analysis of the special features of tourism economy.

SETE:

- Studies the status and contribution of tourism to Greek economy
- Proposes measures for the improvement of quality and the competitiveness enhancement
- Monitors the international developments
- Analyses the growth of tourism sector in competitor countries

SETE research work is supported per case by its staff, expert consultants and university research centres. The results are disseminated and promoted through publications, seminars and through the web. SETE offices house a library with Greek and foreign publications on tourism.

=== Institute of SETE ===
In 2013 SETE established the Institute of the Greek Tourism Confederation (INSETE), commonly abbreviated to Institute of SETE (INSETE), a research and education institute aiming to improve services through tourism data analysis, the provision of intelligence reports, the marketing company Marketing Greece promoting Greece as a tourism destination through the DiscoverGreece.com website, and the provision of professional education with courses in hospitality and hotel operations, customer service, food & beverage, culinary arts, health & safety, and other hospitality subjects. SETE supports the work of researchers, experts, students and collaborates with the academic community.

== Membership ==
SETE Members fall into two main categories:

- Unions of tourism enterprises representing on national level the accommodation, travel, transportation (air, land and sea), exhibitions, conferences and other sectors related to the tourism industry and
- Enterprises across the entire spectrum of direct and indirect tourism activities, including: hotels, travel agencies, transportation, airlines, car rental, cruise ships, sea-ferries, tourist coach services, yachts, as well as tourist interest companies like banks, business consultants, catering, construction companies, development companies, expo-conference organizers, marketing - management companies, museums, publishing, real estate, restaurants, special tourism infrastructure (golf, marinas, conference centres, exhibitions, etc.), vineyards – wineries.

SETE provides a series of services to its Members, in a joint effort to create a more favourable environment for boosting tourism and entrepreneurship:

- Information

SETE Members receive circular documentation, studies and data about markets which concern Greek tourism, and about specific market segments. Moreover, SETE Members are informed on the press releases and the interventions made by SETE to Greek government and the broader public sector.

- Participation

SETE Members can be involved in shaping tourism policy positions and proposals by actively participating in the meetings and events held by SETE (General Assemblies, conferences, regional events, business lunches).

- Promotion

SETE web pages, events and publications allow for the promotion of businesses and services to selected target groups. SETE Members can be promoted through its regular publications for information purposes, i.e. the SETE Annual Report, the e-newsletter “Corporate Citizenship - Members Activities” and the e-newsletter “Members Business News”.

== International presence ==
Each year, SETE Annual Conference takes place and aims to connect tourism entrepreneurship with society, the state, institutions, international markets and the economy.

SETE is present in the major international forums:

- United Nations World Tourism Organization (UNWTO), as an Affiliate Member since 1993
- UNWTO Business Council
- Statistics and TSA Committee of the UN World Tourism Organization
- International Hotel & Restaurant Association (IH&RA), as a member
- The Travel Partnership Corporation (TTPC), as a member
- Various international committees, working groups and councils, either as a full member or as an observer.

Moreover, SETE cooperates with: WTTC (World Travel and Tourism Council), OECD (Organisation for Economic Co-operation and Development), IMF (International Monetary Fund), IFTO (International Federation of Tour Operators), IAGTO (International Association of Golf Tour Operators), TYD (Turkish Tourism Investors Association), Egyptian Tourism Federation, Exceltur (Spain), VisitBritain (British Tourist Authority), Atout France (France Tourism Development Agency, the French National Tourist Office), IMG Tourism, Tourism Intelligence International, ILM Hospitality & Tourism, IPK International, THR Barcelona, Monitor Group, Mintel, Phocuswright, Tourism Industry Intelligence, Eye for Travel.
