= WTM =

WTM may refer to:

- Wellington Tramway Museum
- World Tamil Movement
- World Travel Market
- World Travel Monitor
- What’s the move?
