= Vernicos =

Vernicos is a surname. Notable people with the surname include:

- Georgios Vernicos (born 1950), Greek entrepreneur
- Victor Vernicos (born 2006), Greek singer and songwriter
