= Spyros Kokotos =

Greek architect (1933–2025)

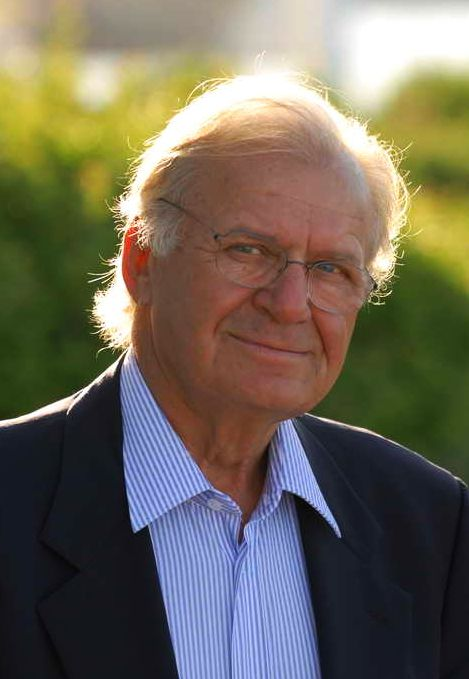
Kokotos in 2007

Spyros Kokotos (Greek: Σπύρος Κοκοτός; 30 October 1933 – 2 September 2025) was a Greek architect.

== Early life and education ==
Kokotos was born on 30 October 1933. He spent his childhood in the village of Dafnes, approximately 15 kilometres (9.3 mi) south of the city of Herakleion. He attended the Lyceum Korais, before being admitted to the School of Architecture of the National Technical University of Athens in 1953.

== Military service ==
In 1959, Kokotos was drafted in the Hellenic Navy and received a military commission as an ensign in December 1959. He was stationed at the naval port of Souda in his native Crete, where he served in Naval Public Works until July 1960. He was then transferred to the navy's Hydrographic Office, where he served until May 1961, when he was again transferred to the Officers' Autonomous Building Society and was charged with architectural work on the expansion of the General Papagos suburb in Athens. In April 1962, he received extensive leave from the navy, and was finally discharged in 1982.

== Professional career ==
Even while still attending university, Kokotos worked as a junior architect on the Athens Hilton project, so since graduation he has been mainly involved with tourism projects, having built more than 40 hotels throughout Greece.

Collaborating closely with his brother George, a civil engineer, they designed and built a number of hotels on the island of Rhodes, including the Esperia hotel (200 units) and Aura hotel (150 units), culminating in the design and construction of the Rodos Bay hotel (currently known as Amathus Beach Hotel) with 260 rooms and suites, and 60 bungalows.

Other early hotel projects in the early 1960s include the El Greco hotel (120 units) and Emmanuel N. Foundoulaki's Esperia hotel S.A. (53 units) in Heraklion, Crete, the Hermes hotel in Aghios Nikolaos, Crete (250 units), and the Arcadio and Olympic hotels on the island of Corfu.

Having established a reputation as one of the country's finest architects for hotels, Kokotos also designed the Club Med hotel on the island of Kos, the Poseidon Hotel in Loutraki, and the Minos Palace hotel in Aghios Nikolaos, Crete.

== Personal life and death ==
In 1973, Kokotos married Eliana (née Sotirchou), with whom he had three children: Fotis (born 1974), Ilias (born 1975), and Marina (born 1980).

Kokotos died on the morning of 2 September 2025, at the age of 91, in Agios Nikolaos, Crete.

== Personal achievements ==
Kokotos is more widely recognised for and credited with the creation of the luxurious hotels and resorts of Elounda in his native Crete, where he designed and built five 5-star hotels.

Kokotos was also one of the founding members and first president of the Association of Greek Tourism Enterprises (SETE) SETE is now widely recognised as the main influence behind Greek tourism policy, acting as a preferred partner to the Greek government.
