= Sounion =

Greek cape at the southernmost tip of the Attic peninsula

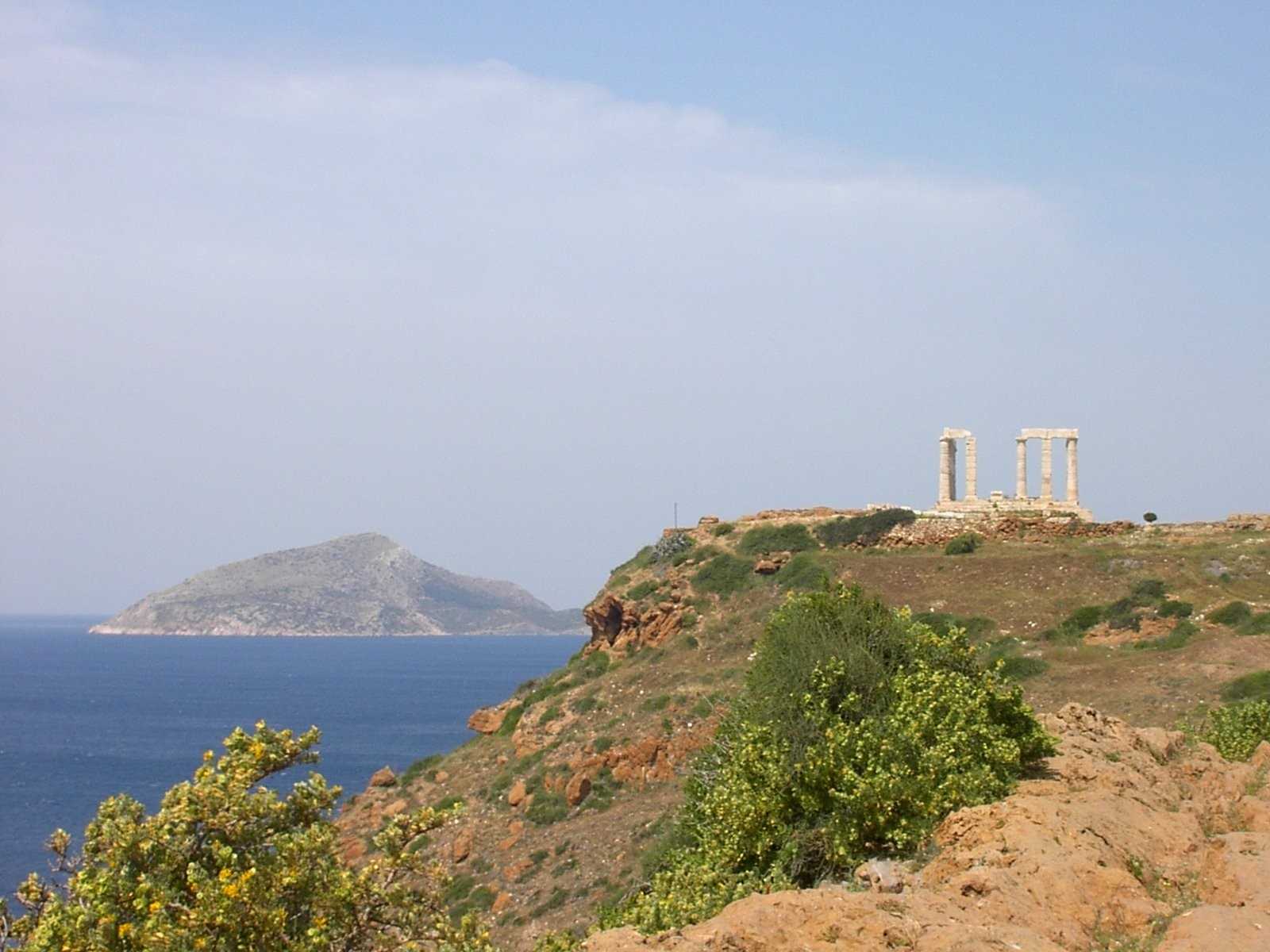
View of Cape Sounion and the ruins of the Temple of Poseidon looking west, with Patroklos island visible in the background

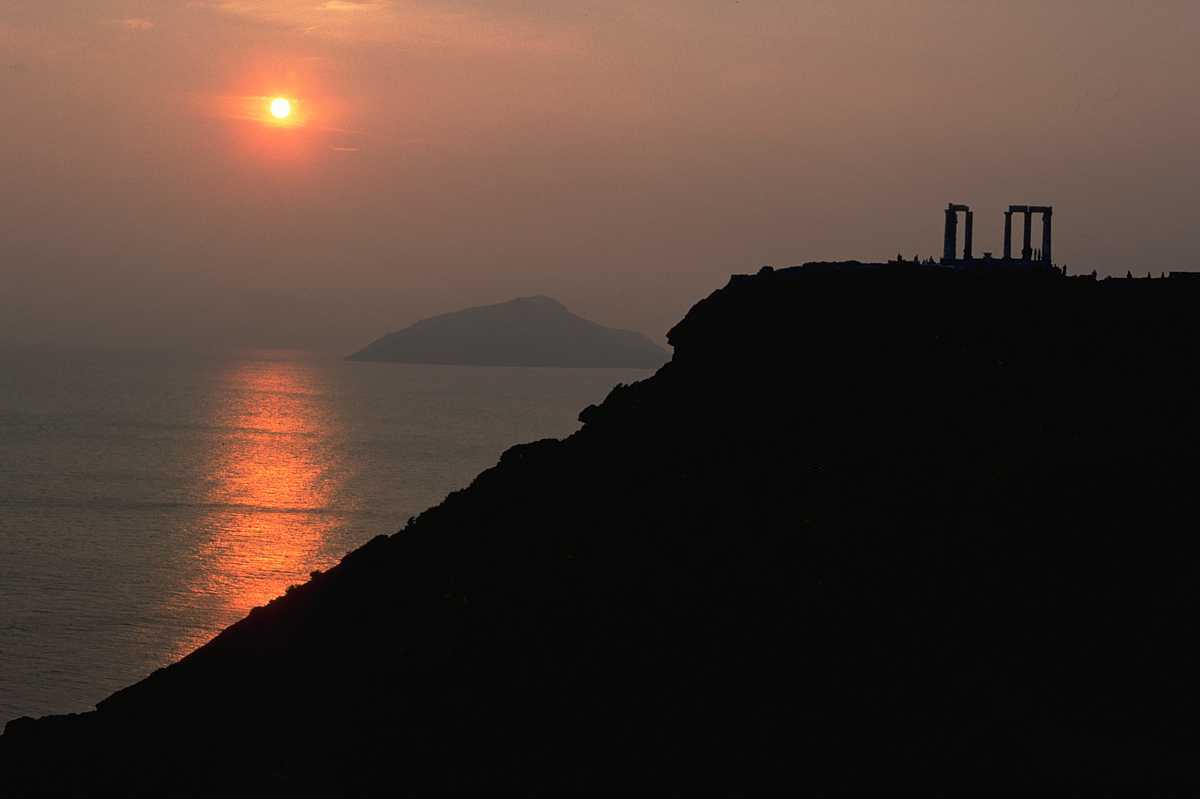
Sunset at Cape Sounion

Cape Sounion (Modern Greek: Aκρωτήριο Σούνιο Akrotírio Soúnio [akroˈtirʝo ˈsuɲo]; Ancient Greek: Ἄκρον Σούνιον Άkron Soúnion, Latinized Sunium; Venetian: Capo Colonne "Cape of Columns") is the promontory at the southernmost tip of the Attica peninsula, 8 kilometres (5.0 mi) south of the town of Lavrio (ancient Thoricus), and 69.5 km (43.1 miles) southeast of Athens in the Athens Riviera. It is part of Lavreotiki municipality, East Attica, Greece.

Cape Sounion is noted for its Temple of Poseidon, one of the major monuments of the Golden Age of Athens. Its remains are perched on the headland, surrounded on three sides by the Aegean Sea.

== Climate ==
Cape Sounio has a hot semi-arid climate (Köppen climate classification: BSh). Cape Sounio experiences hot, dry summers and mild, wetter winters.

Climate data for Sounio
Month	Jan	Feb	Mar	Apr	May	Jun	Jul	Aug	Sep	Oct	Nov	Dec	Year
Mean daily maximum °C (°F)	14.8 (58.6)	15.5 (59.9)	16.6 (61.9)	20.1 (68.2)	25.4 (77.7)	29.9 (85.8)	33.4 (92.1)	33.1 (91.6)	29.1 (84.4)	24.9 (76.8)	20.4 (68.7)	16.8 (62.2)	23.3 (74.0)
Daily mean °C (°F)	11.5 (52.7)	11.8 (53.2)	12.9 (55.2)	16.1 (61.0)	20.8 (69.4)	25.3 (77.5)	29.0 (84.2)	28.8 (83.8)	25.1 (77.2)	21.3 (70.3)	17.4 (63.3)	14.0 (57.2)	19.5 (67.1)
Mean daily minimum °C (°F)	8.3 (46.9)	8.2 (46.8)	9.3 (48.7)	12.0 (53.6)	16.3 (61.3)	20.8 (69.4)	24.5 (76.1)	24.5 (76.1)	21.2 (70.2)	17.6 (63.7)	14.4 (57.9)	11.3 (52.3)	15.7 (60.3)
Average rainfall mm (inches)	58.3 (2.30)	22.2 (0.87)	31.6 (1.24)	14.7 (0.58)	2.9 (0.11)	7.6 (0.30)	1.6 (0.06)	2.5 (0.10)	40.0 (1.57)	20.6 (0.81)	62.8 (2.47)	110.3 (4.34)	375.1 (14.75)
Source: National Observatory of Athens Monthly Bulletins (Jul 2019- Oct 2023)

== History ==
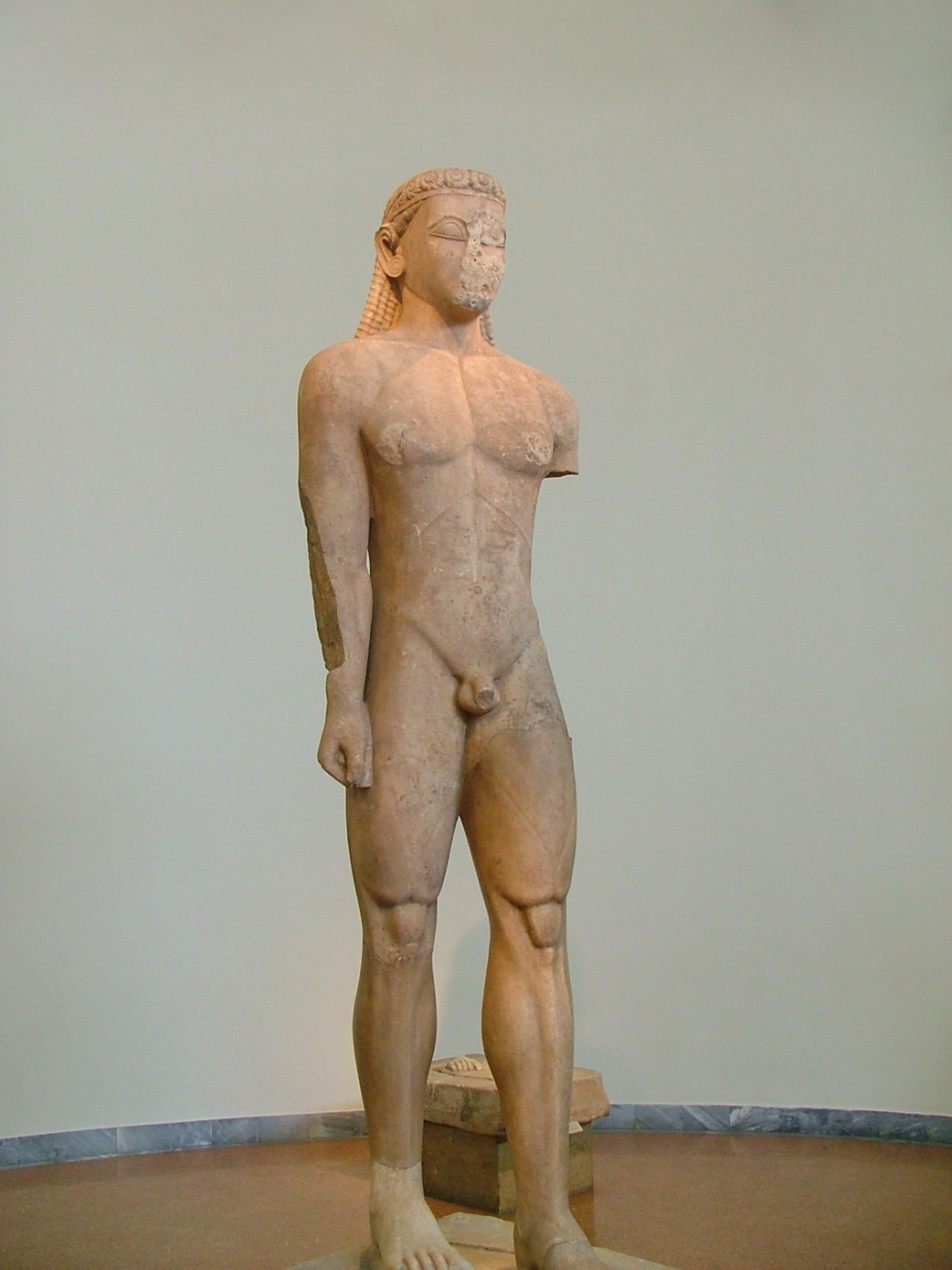
Sounion Kouros (c. 600 BC), National Archaeological Museum of Athens

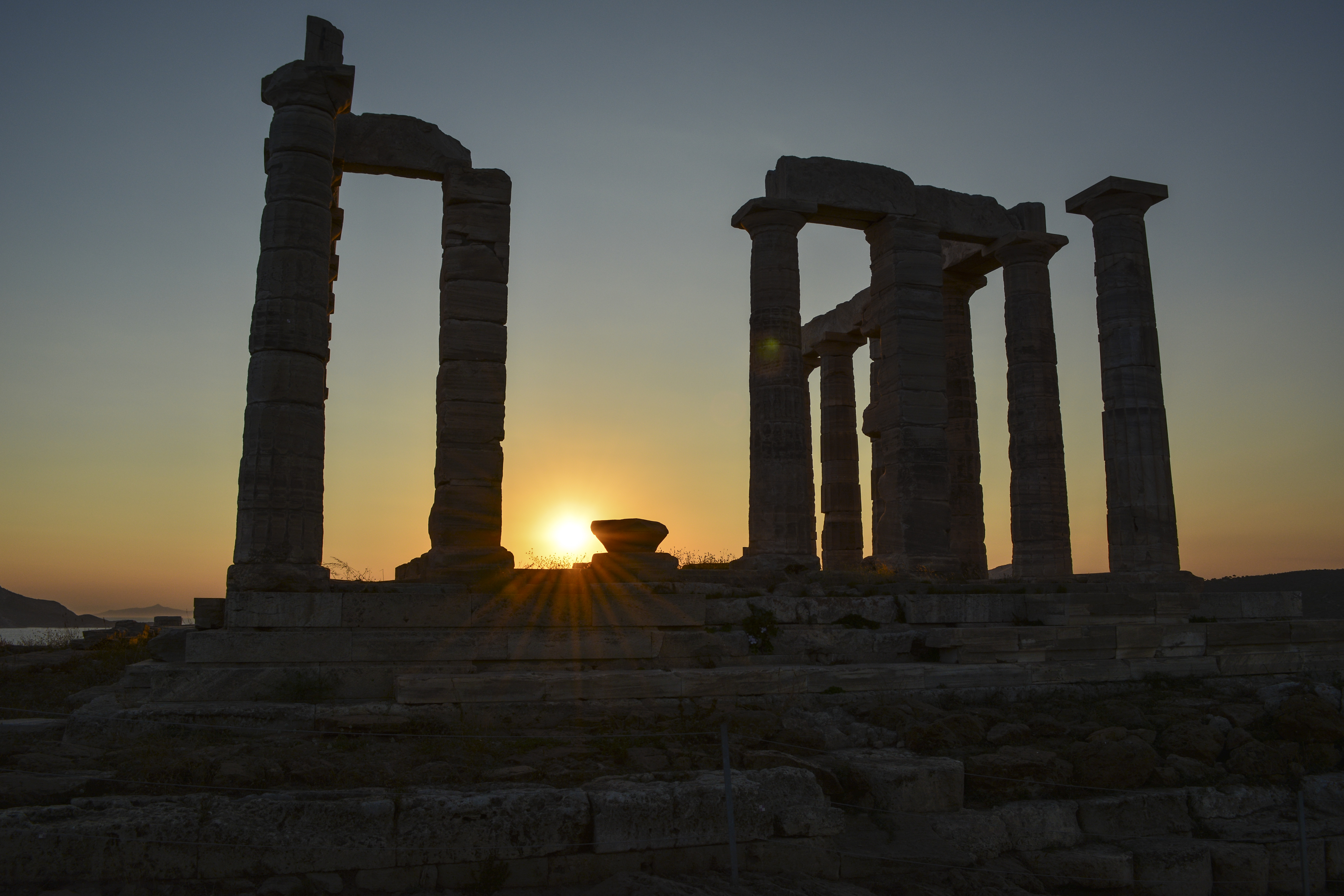
View of the Temple of Poseidon in the sunset

The earliest literary reference to Sounion is in Homer's Odyssey (III. 278–285). The story recounts that as the various Greek commanders sailed back from Troy, the helmsman of the ship of King Menelaus of Sparta died at his post while rounding "Holy Sounion, Cape of Athens." Menelaus landed at Sounion to give his companion full funeral honours (i.e., cremation on a funeral pyre on the beach).

Archaeological finds on the site date from as early as 700 BC. Herodotus (VI.87) mentions that in 6th century BC, the Athenians celebrated a quadrennial festival at Sounion, which involved Athens' leaders sailing to the cape in a sacred boat.

=== Deme ===
Sounion was a deme of the Leontis tribe (phyle) even before its fortification in the Peloponnesian War. It sent four men to the ancient Boule of 500 at the time of Cleisthenes, and later (3rd century BC) six men to the Boule of 600. In the 2nd century BC, Sounion is still on record as a deme, but now considered part of the recently introduced Attalid phyle (created in honour of Attalus I).

The deme was located between Amphitrope to the west and Thorikos to the north. Its territory included parts of the Mines of Laurion. According to Traill (1986), the center of the settlement was situated somewhat to the north of the cape, between the modern settlements of Ano Sounio and Kato Sounio (close to 37.674°N 24.030°E).

Sounion was fortified in the nineteenth year of the Peloponnesian War (413 BCE) for the purpose of protecting the passage of the cornships to Athens, and was regarded from that time as one of the principal fortresses of Attica. Its proximity to the silver mines of Laurium probably contributed to its prosperity, which passed into a proverb; but even in the time of Cicero it had sunk into decay. The circuit of the walls may still be traced, except where the precipitous nature of the rocks afforded a natural defence. The walls which are fortified with square towers, are of the most regular Hellenic masonry, and enclose a space of a little more than half a mile in circumference. The southern part of Attica, extending northwards from the promontory of Sounion as far as Thoricus on the east, and Anaphlystus on the west, is called by Herodotus the Suniac angle (τὸν γουνὸν τὸν Σουνιακόν). Though Sounion was especially sacred to Athena, we learn from Aristophanes that Poseidon was also worshipped there.

=== Temple of Poseidon ===
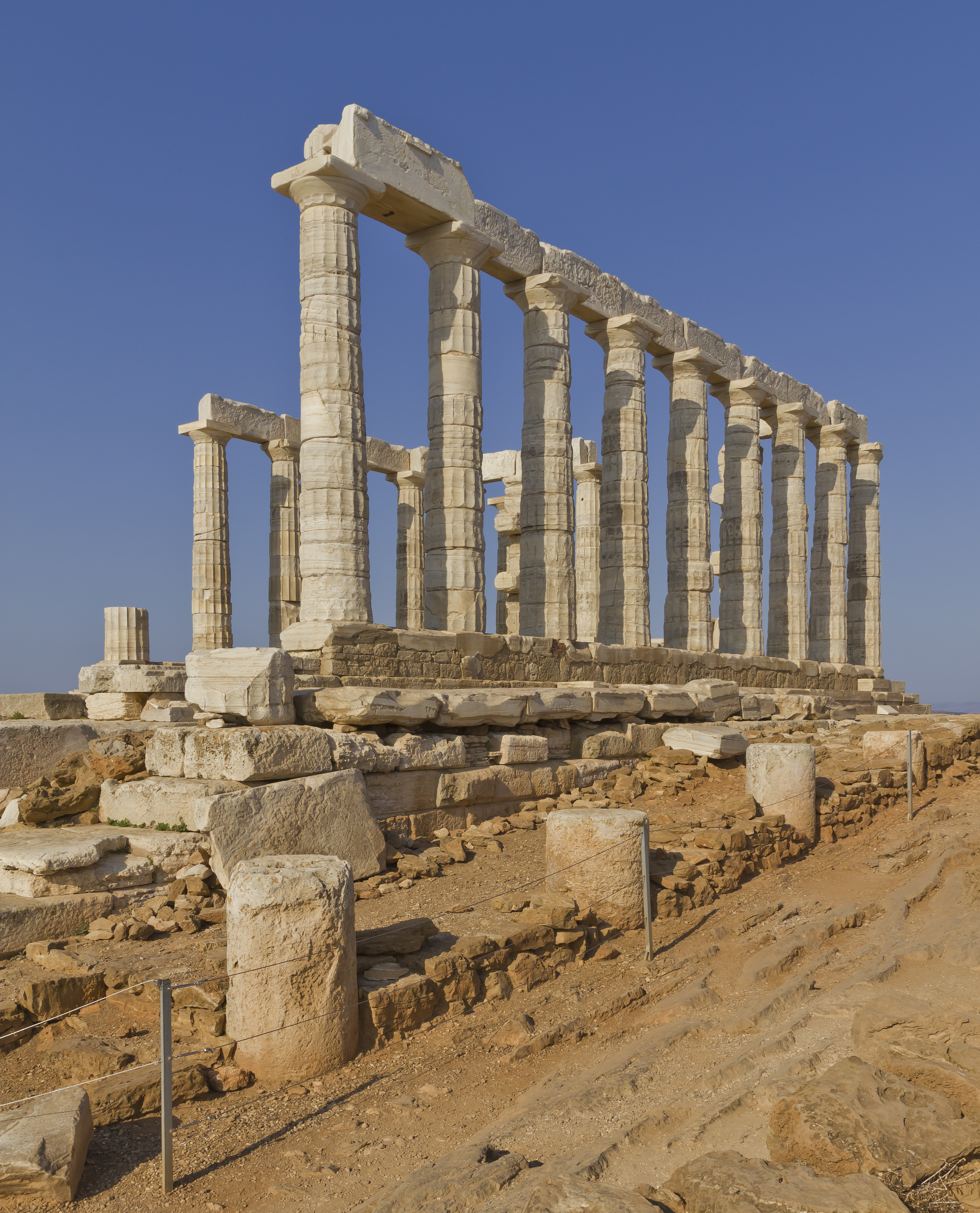
Temple of Poseidon at Cape Sounion, built c. 440 BC

The original, Archaic-period temple of Poseidon on the site was built of tufa. The Sounion Kouros, discovered in 1906 in a pit east of the temple alongside fragments of other statues, was probably one of a number of votive statues dedicated to Poseidon which probably stood in front of the god's sanctuary. The Archaic temple was probably destroyed in 480 BC by Persian troops during Xerxes I's invasion of Greece. After they defeated Xerxes in the naval Battle of Salamis, the Athenians placed an entire captured enemy trireme (warship with three banks of oars) at Sounion as a trophy dedicated to Poseidon.

The temple of Poseidon at Sounion was constructed in 444–440 BC. This was during the ascendancy of the Athenian statesman Pericles, who also rebuilt the Parthenon in Athens. It was built on the ruins of a temple dating from the Archaic period. It is perched above the sea at a height of almost 60 metres (200 ft). The design of the temple is a typical hexastyle, i.e., it had a front portico with six columns. Only some columns of the Sounion temple stand today, but when intact it would have closely resembled the contemporary and well-preserved Temple of Hephaestus beneath the Acropolis, which may have been designed by the same architect.

As with all Greek temples, the Poseidon building was rectangular, with a colonnade on all four sides. The total number of original columns was 34, of which 15 still stand today. The columns are of the Doric Order. They were made of locally quarried white marble. They were 6.10 m (20 ft) high, with a diameter of 1 m (3.1 ft) at the base and 79 cm (31 inches) at the top. At the center of the temple, there would have been a hall of worship (naos), a windowless rectangular room, similar to the partly intact hall at the Temple of Hephaestus. It would have contained, at one end facing the entrance, the cult image, a colossal, ceiling-height (6 metres (20 ft)) bronze statue of Poseidon.

=== Temple of Athena ===
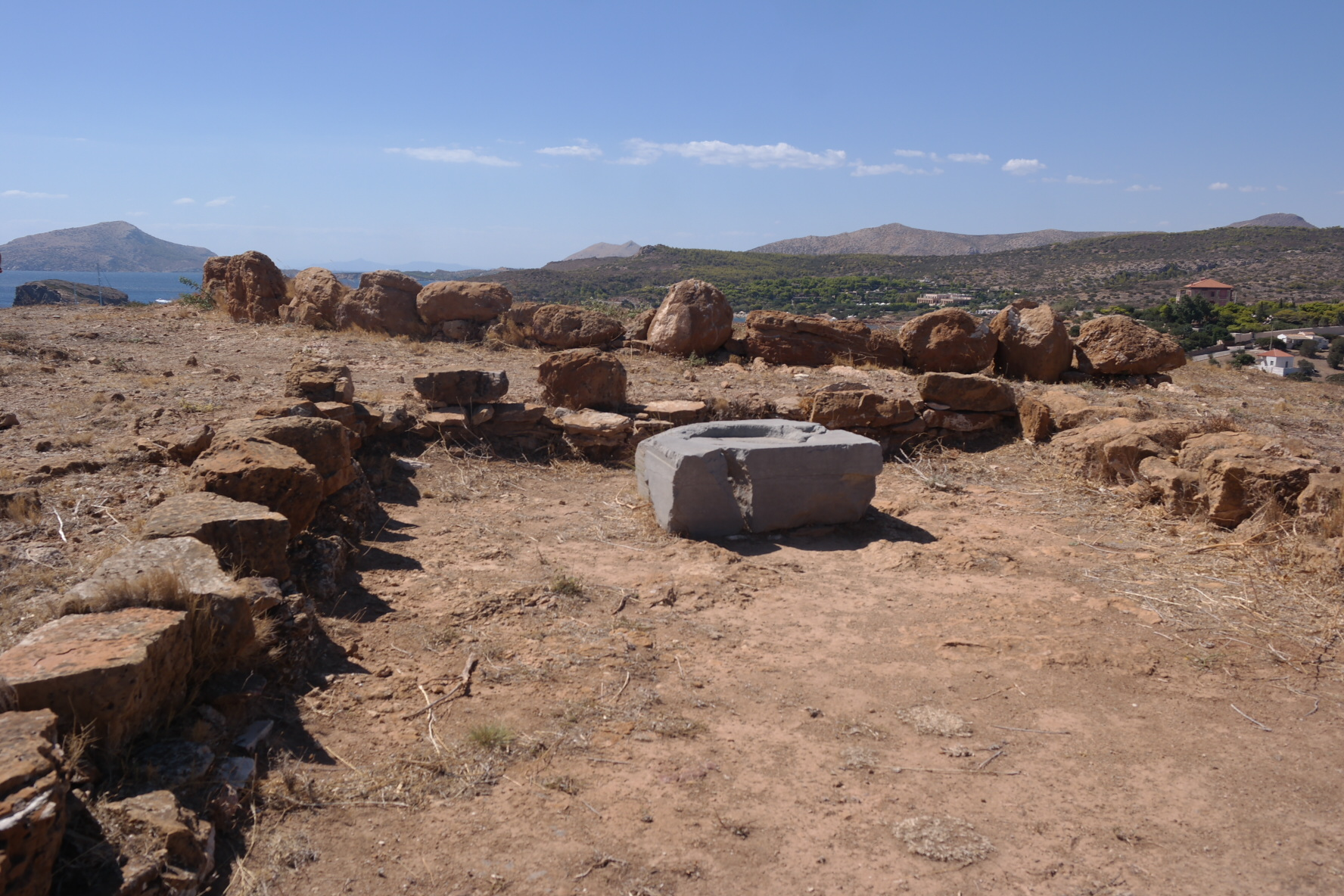
View from within the remains of the temple of Athena, looking west

The temple of Athena Souniados (Ναός της Αθηνάς Σουνιάδος 37.653°N 024.027°E), was located on a low hill some 300 m northeast of the temple of Poseidon. It was built in 470 BC, replacing an older building of the 6th century BCE (https://www.ancient-greece.org/architecture/temple-athena-sounio.html). Its architecture was unusual, as it had colonnades on the southern and eastern sides, but not on the western or northern sides, a peculiarity mentioned by Vitruvius. It was built adjacent to a peribolos identified as the burial mound and shrine to Phrontis, the helmsman of Menelaus whose burial at Sounion is mentioned in the Odyssey.

A smaller Doric temple next to the temple of Athena is thought to have been dedicated either to the hero Phrontis or to Artemis.

A deep pit southeast of the temenos was used to deposit the remains of the Archaic-period offerings destroyed during the Persian invasion.

The temple of Athena was demolished in the 1st century AD, and parts of its columns were taken to Athens to be used in the South-East temple of the Agora.

=== Fortress ===
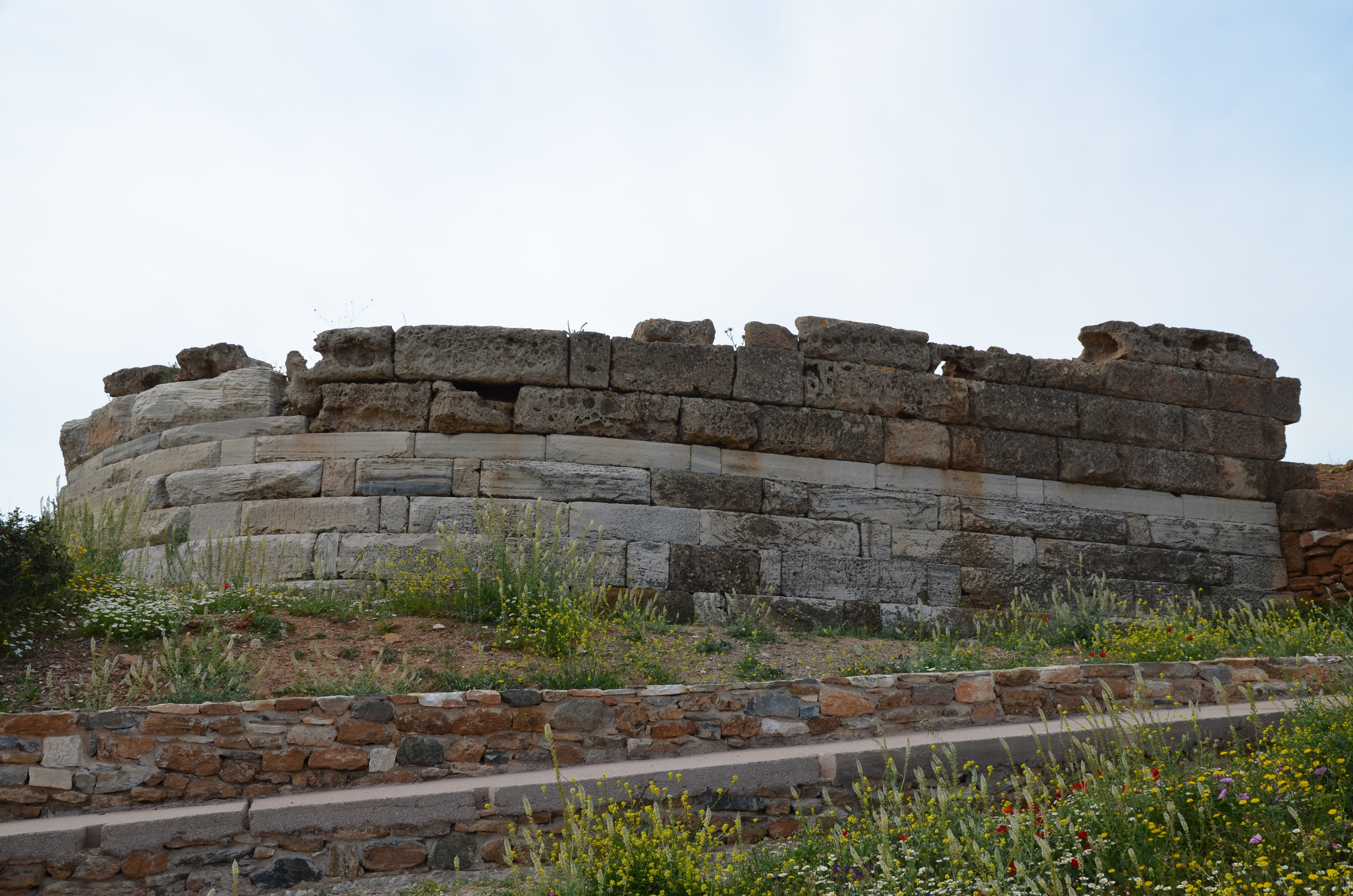
Remains of Bastion Delta seen from the north

In 413 BC, during the Peloponnesian War against the Spartans, the Athenians fortified the site with a wall and towers to prevent it from falling into Spartan hands. This would have threatened Athens' seaborne grain supply route from Euboea. Athens' supply situation had become critical since the city's land supply lines had been cut by the Spartan fortification of Dekeleia, to the north of Attica. The Sounion fortress was later seized from the Athenians by a force of rebel slaves from the nearby silver mines of Laurium.

The Temple of Poseidon was situated in the southeastern corner of the fortress, with the garrison quarters arranged along a main stream on the western slope of the hill. The fortress included a small naval base, with a shipshed for two warships in the northwestern corner (37.6524°N 24.0228°E). The fortress was maintained well into the Hellenistic period. Repairs and additions to the fortress were made during the Chremonidean War (266–261 BC).

== Literary reception ==
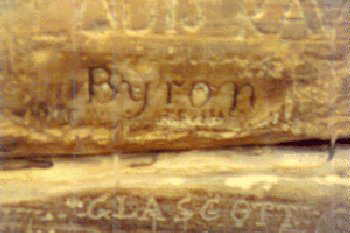
Lord Byron's name carved into temple of Poseidon

The name Capo Colonne (graecicized Καβοκολώνες Kavokolones) is reported from the 17th century, for the reason that, unusually, several columns of the temple of Poseidon had remained standing since antiquity. Early modern descriptions in travelogues include those by George Wheler (1676), Lady Mary Wortley Montagu (1718), Jean-Baptiste Le Roy (1754), Richard Chandler (1765) and Edward Dodwell (1805). Scottish poet William Falconer (1732–1769) was shipwrecked off Cape Colonna, as Sounion was then known, in 1750, an event depicted in the central scene of his The Shipwreck (1762).

The inscribed name of Lord Byron, carved into the base of one of the columns of the Temple of Poseidon, possibly dates from his first visit to Greece, on his Grand Tour of Europe before he acquired fame. Byron spent several months in 1810–11 in Athens, including two documented visits to Sounion. There is, however, no direct evidence that the inscription was made by Byron himself. Byron mentions Sounion in his poem Isles of Greece:

Place me on Sunium's marbled steep,
Where nothing, save the waves and I,
May hear our mutual murmurs sweep...

Martin Heidegger visited Sounion during his journey to Greece in 1962, as described in his book Sojourns. He refers to the "gleaming-white ruins of the temple". In the strong sea breeze "these few standing columns were the strings of an invisible lyre, the song of which the far-seeing Delian god let resonate over the Cycladic world of islands". He marvels at "the way that this single gesture of the land suggests the invisible nearness of the divine and dedicates to it every growth and every human work" (ibid.). He goes on to reflect "the people of this country knew how to inhabit and demarcate the world against the barbarous in honour of the seat of the gods. ...they knew how to praise what is great and by acknowledging it, to bring themselves in front of the sublime, founding, in this way, a world" (ibid.).

== Modern development ==
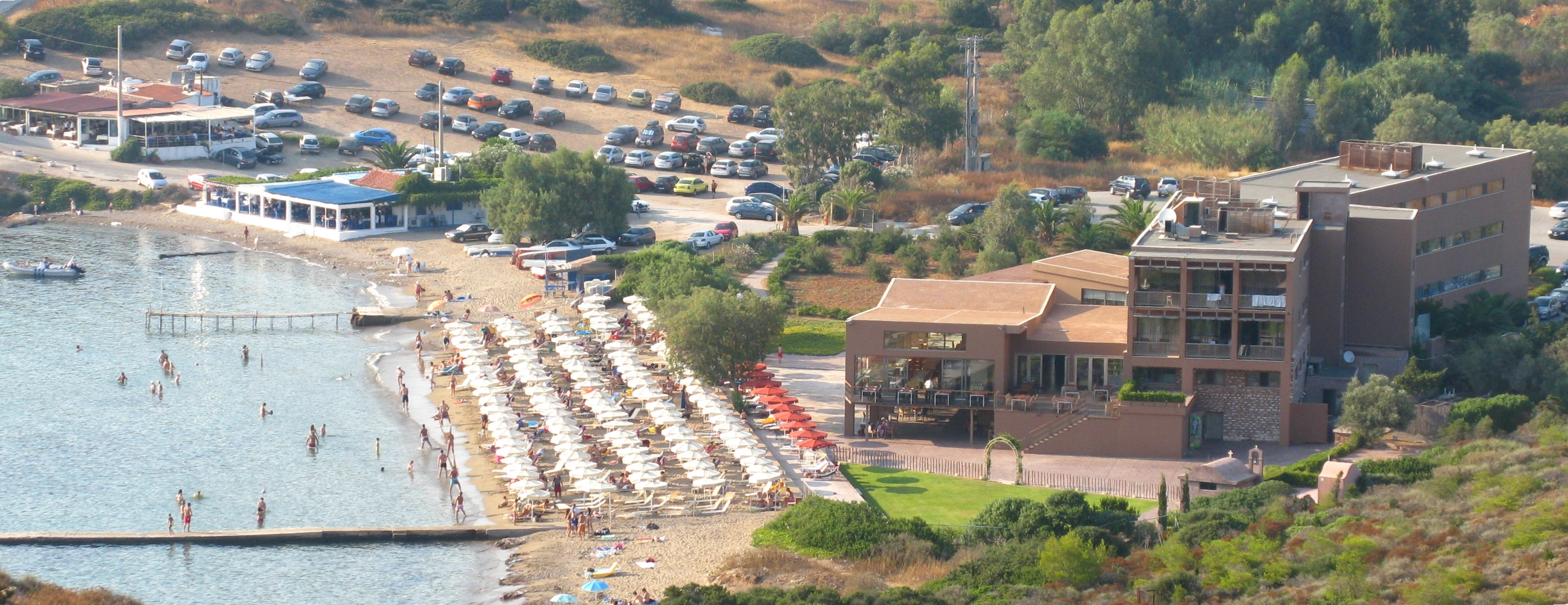
Sounion beach and Aegeon Beach hotel, seen from Cape Sounion (July 2009)

Cape Sounion remains a popular day-excursion for tourists from Athens, with the sunset over the Aegean Sea, as viewed from the ruins, a sought-after sight since the first development of modern tourism in the early 19th century.

The Lavreotiki municipality was established in 1890 under the name of Sounio, and renamed to Lavreotiki in 1891. Cape Sounion itself is located between the villages of Kato Sounio and Legrena.

The Sounio national park (Εθνικός Δρυμός τού Σουνίου) was established in 1974 with a core area of 750 hectares.

Forming the southeastern endpoint of the Athens Riviera, Sounion is now an upscale summer home location for Athenians. Construction of villas across the bay northwest of Cape Sounion flourished in the 1960s to 1970s. The Grecotel Cape Sounio luxury resort was built in 1973.

The project Arrangement of the Archaeological Site of Sounion (2011–2013) was co-financed by the Greek Ministry of Culture and Sports and the European Union (ERDF).

== Notes ==
- "Sounion" in: Stillwell (ed.), The Princeton Encyclopedia of Classical Sites (2017), p. 854.
