= Grecotel =

Hotel chain in Greece

- Type: Private
- Industry: Hospitality
- Founder: Dimitris Pierides
- Headquarters: Rethymno, Crete, Greece
- Number of locations: 35 hotels
- Area served: Greece
- Key people: Nikos Daskalandonakis
- Number of employees: ▲6,100
- Parent: N. Daskalandonakis Group
- Website: www.grecotel.com

Grecotel S. A., part of N. Daskalandonakis Group, is the largest luxury hotel chain in Greece.

== History ==
As of 2014, the company reported a turnover of 151 million euros, 1.85 million lodging nights. Grecotel has a total of 40 hotels as of 2025. Hotels in the Peloponnese and Crete operate from March to mid-November; the resort at Cape Sounio (Attic Riviera) is operational until late December.

N. Daskalantonakis Group, the main owner of Grecotel, is a family business, Greece's leading tourism businesses, which is reportedly involved in 60 companies.

German tour operator TUI Group acquired 50% ownership of Grecotel in 1981. The brothers Nikos and Takis (1931–2012) Daskalantonakis (Δασκαλαντωνάκης), olive oil traders of Rethymno, Crete, in 1976 opened their first hotel outside of Rethymno, Rithimno Beach. Other hotels in Crete followed in the late 1970s to early 1980s. They bought 50% of Grecotel from Cypriot businessman Dimitris Pierides in 1986.

In the years leading up to the 2004 Summer Olympics in Athens, the owners made substantial investments which however did not yield the expected results. After the 2008 financial crisis, the company came into difficulties and in 2012 had to be rescued by TUI Group.

The investments specifically concerned the hotels in the historical center of Athens, which fell victim to chronic degradation in after the 2008 financial crisis, turning into "immigrant ghettos" rife with crime, coinciding with a drop in lodging nights in hotels there.

Within the Daskalandonakis family, there was a prolonged legal dispute over the control of the business, sparked by the financial difficulties, lasting from 2008 to 2017. Founder Nikos Daskalandonakis and his daughter Mari Daskalantonaki (wife of politician Nikolaos Sifounakis) won the case against his now-ex-wife and his other two children in Supreme Court decision 1340/2017.

In 2015, TUI sold its share of the company to the private owners, the Daskalantonakis family. There was some speculation in Greek media regarding possible disputes over further investment plans as the reason for this decision. Today, Grecotel Hotels & Resorts is the leader in the luxury hospitality in Greece, with THE DOLLI at Acropolis being named #1 Hotel in Greece for 2024, by CNT Readers' Choice Awards among many other accolades for its properties, spanning 15 destinations.

== See also ==
- Tourism in Greece#Infrastructure
- Association of Greek Tourism Enterprises
