= Discovergreece.com =

Greek travel website

DiscoverGreece.com
- Website type: Travel Guide service
- Available in: 8 languages languages
- List of languages Greek, English, French, Spanish, Italian, Russian, Turkish, German
- Headquarters: Athens, Greece
- Owner: Marketing Greece
- Website: discovergreece.com
- Commercial: Yes
- Registration: Optional
- Launched: 2014
- Current status: Online

Discover Greece is a Greek online traveling web portal, owned and operated by Marketing Greece. It was launched in February 2014 and offers information on destinations and experiences around the country. While initially featuring only Greek and English language versions, in April 2014 the site added German, French and Russian language options, with Turkish added in May 2015 and Italian and Spanish in 2018 and 2020 respectively.

== Services ==
The portal provides information on more than 120 destinations in Greece including 30 Greek themes. Visitors can watch more than 60 videos and 3000 photographs from all over Greece. The website also provides a directory of events in Greece and a booking functionality for hotels and air tickets.

== Research and strategy ==
Discover Greece focuses on the product dimension of Greek tourism. By utilising research from McKinsey's regarding the development of Greek tourism the portal strategically integrates technology and most up-to-date practices of digital communication to entice its audience. The portal's ultimate goal is to create a global social community of supporters of Greek tourism.
