= Georgios Vernicos =

Greek entrepreneur and politician

George Vernicos Γιώργος Βερνίκος
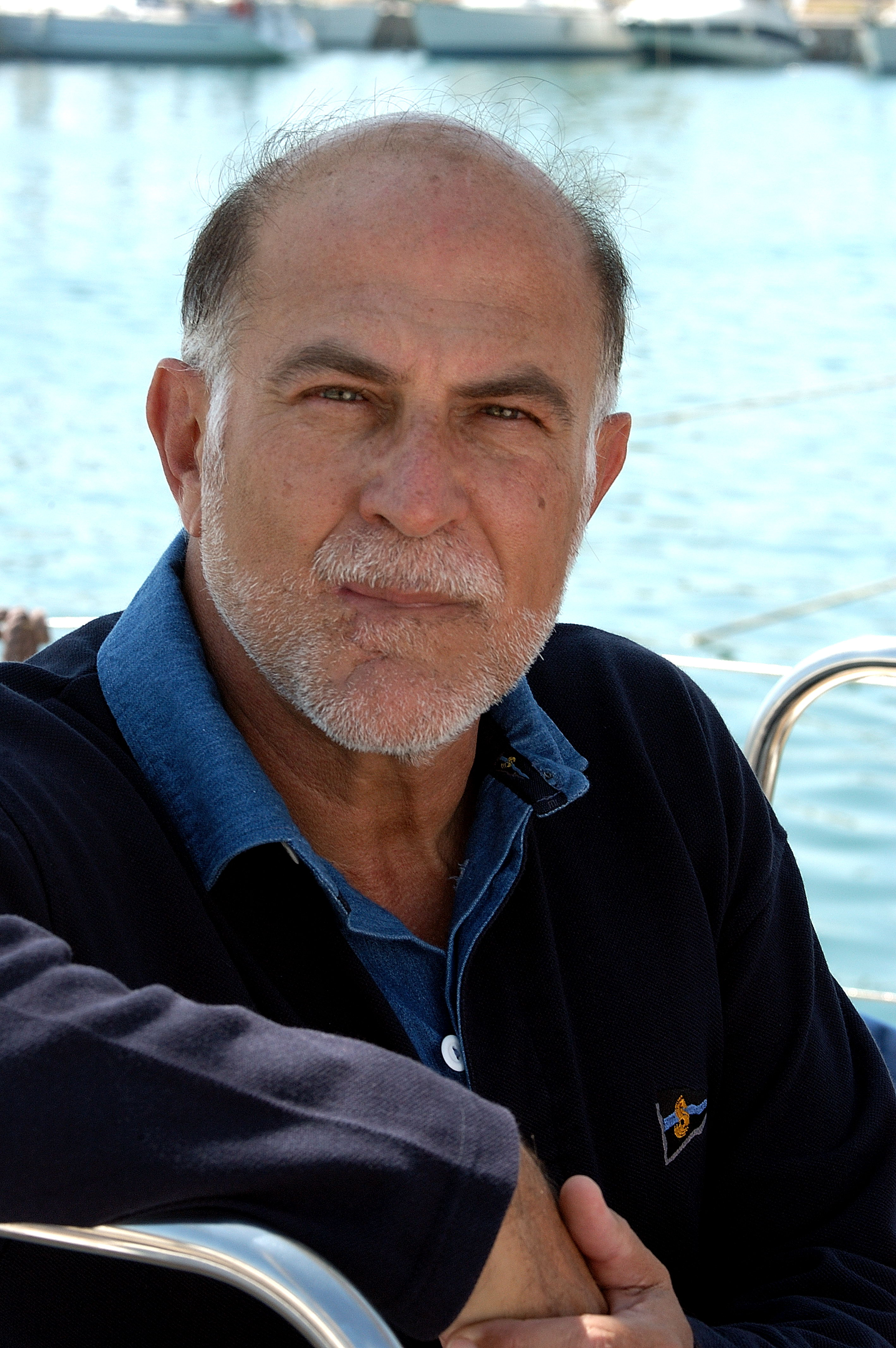
- Incumbent
- Assumed office 20 June 2012

Vice-Minister of Shipping
- In office 21 June 2012 – 30 July 2012
- President: Karolos Papoulias
- Prime Minister: Antonis Samaras

Personal details
- Born: 11 February 1950 (age 76) Athens, Greece
- Education: Athens University; London University

George A. Vernicos (also Georgios Vernikos/ Greek: Γιώργος Βερνίκος; born 11 February 1950) is a Greek businessman and politician. He was elected as a deputy to the Hellenic Parliament in the Greek legislative election of June 2012.

He has an extensive entrepreneurial and social presence. His professional activities primarily focus on the development of maritime tourism.

He is a member of numerous Organizations and Chambers.

== Political career ==
He served as Deputy Minister for Merchant Marine and Aegean Affairs under the Cabinet of Antonis Samaras from June 21, 2012, until his formal resignation on July 5, 2012.

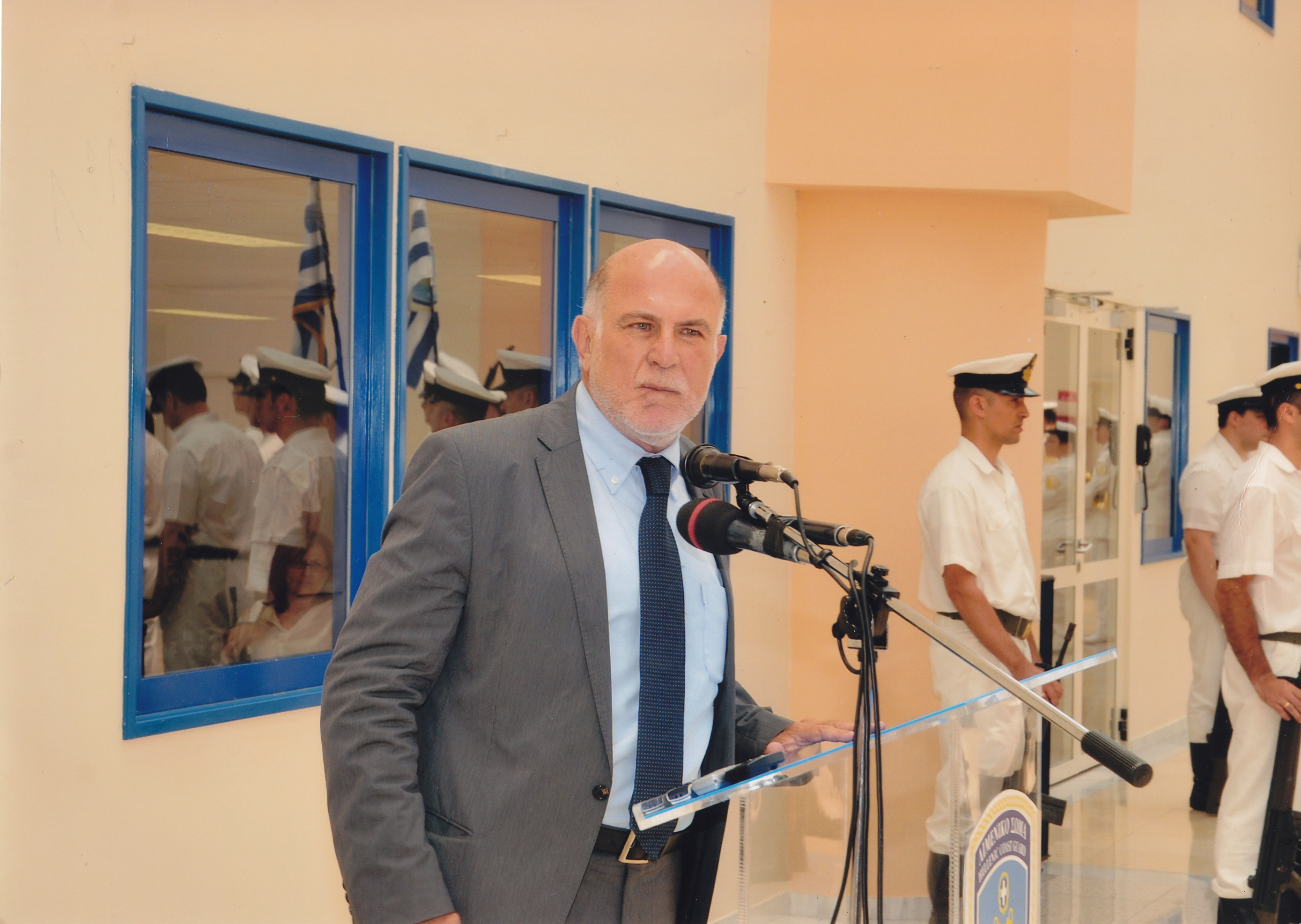
George Vernicos after being appointed Vice-Minister of Shipping

George Vernicos currently is Member of the Board of the Association of Greek Tourism Enterprises (SETE) and Honorary Member of the Board of the Hellenic Chamber of Shipping, He represents the tourism sector at the Economic and Social Council of Greece (OKE) (he has been President from October 2015 to February 2021) and at European Economic and Social Committee(EESC). He is also an Ambassador for the EUROPEAN CLIMATE PACT of the European Union. Additionally, he is chairman of Vernicos Yachts. and Verina Hotels Sifnos.
