= World Travel Monitor =

Worldwide tourism information system

The World Travel Monitor (WTM) / European Travel Monitor (ETM) is a worldwide tourism information system detailing the foreign (outbound) travel behaviour practiced by a country's respective resident population.

== Origins and objective ==
The European Travel Monitor has been continuously surveying the most important data on outbound travel behaviour from all European countries since 1988. In 1995, the European Travel Monitor was expanded to the World Travel Monitor to cover all the important overseas markets (United States, Canada, Australia, Argentina, Brazil, United Arab Emirates, Saudi Arabia, Japan, China, India, etc.). Data is collected by the architects of the Monitor or by means of working cooperations in the various countries. Today (2013), the World Travel Monitor chronicles about 90% of all international travel flows. Conceived and realised by IPK International, the surveys have the objective of tracking all outbound travel of at least one overnight stay, regardless of travel motive. Apart from holiday trips, business trips and all other private trips (e.g. visiting friends or relatives) are also recorded.

The driving impetus behind establishing this information system – initially for Germany (German Travel Monitor) and Europe – was that it was not possible for decision-makers in the tourism field, based on the information available to them up to that point in time, to gain an overview of the European market or any overseas markets (in the form of a database enabling a direct comparison of aspects such as the volume and structure of outbound trips taken by the Germans, Americans, British, Russians, Chinese, etc.). While various surveys and official statistics were available prior to the introduction of the World Travel Monitor / European Travel Monitor, the individual datasets were virtually impossible to compare because there were major dissimilarities among the samplings as well as among the survey methods used in the individual countries.

The World Travel Monitor / European Travel Monitor are cooperative partnership studies. Main contracting entities include national and regional tourist boards, tourism and economics ministries, tour operators, international hotel chains, advertising agencies, consulting firms, etc.

== Methodology ==
The World Travel Monitor / European Travel Monitor are population-representative surveys; i.e., the composition of the sample corresponds to the composition of the population in the respective countries (over the age of 15). Study respondents are surveyed by computer-supported telephone, face-to-face interviews (the so-called CATI and CAPI methods) or via online interviews. The number of interviews conducted varies depending upon the size and significance of a source market (from 2,000 interviews per year in smaller markets up to 24,000 interviews per year in large markets). Altogether, approximately 500,000 interviews are conducted annually on behalf of the World Travel Monitor.

This large sample size translates into better quality and yields a stronger, more profound statistical analysis of the data acquired. It also allows a considerably more precise analytical market segmenting so that reliable information can be furnished even on smaller segments.

All the important parameters of travel are surveyed using a standardized questionnaire, the basic questions of which have remained unchanged since 1988. The questionnaire used for the World Travel Monitor / European Travel Monitor factors in both a determination of travel volume (number of trips taken abroad) as well as numerous individual trip characteristics. Apart from the number of trips/overnights, the following parameters are identified:

- number of outbound trips / market volume
- destination countries (worldwide)
- destination regions / cities
- purpose of trip (business trip, holiday trip, other trips (VFR, pilgrimage, language holiday))
- holiday types / segments (sunseekers, tours, specific cities, mountain trips, cruises, winter sports, wellness/health-motivated, etc.)
- holiday motives / activities (relaxing, sightseeing, get to know the country and its people, good food and drinks etc.)
- repeat visits of a destination
- types of business trips (MICE-Meeting, Incentive, Convention, Exhibition as well as traditional business trips)
- length of trip
- means of transportation (incl. low-fare)
- accommodation types / categories (5*, 4*, 3*, 2/1* hotel, other accommodation (holiday home, camping etc.))
- booking -behaviour / -sites / -products / -period
- internet usage
- travel information sources
- trips with children
- travel season
- travel spending
- target group / traveler profile (gender / age / education / income / children in household / household size)
- regional focus markets
- travel frequency
- travel intensity
