= Cappadocia (Roman province) =

Roman province located in modern-day Turkey

Coordinates: 38.6706°N 34.8392°E

Provincia Cappadocia ἐπαρχία Καππαδοκίας
- Province of the Roman Empire
- 17 AD–mid-7th century
- The Roman empire in the time of Hadrian (117–138 AD), with the imperial province of Cappadocia highlighted.
- Capital: Caesarea (modern-day Kayseri, Turkey)
- Historical era: Antiquity
  - Annexed by Emperor Tiberius: 17 AD
  - Thematic reorganization: mid-7th century
Preceded by
Kingdom of Cappadocia
Succeeded by
Armeniac Theme
Koloneia (theme)
Chaldia
Charsianon
Sebasteia (theme)
Cappadocia (theme)
- Today part of: Turkey

Cappadocia was a province of the Roman Empire in Anatolia (modern central-eastern Turkey), with its capital at Caesarea. It was established in 17 AD by the Emperor Tiberius (ruled 14–37 AD), following the death of Cappadocia's last king, Archelaus.

Cappadocia was an imperial province, meaning that its governor (legatus Augusti) was directly appointed by the emperor. During the latter 1st century, the province also incorporated the regions of Pontus and Armenia Minor.

== History ==
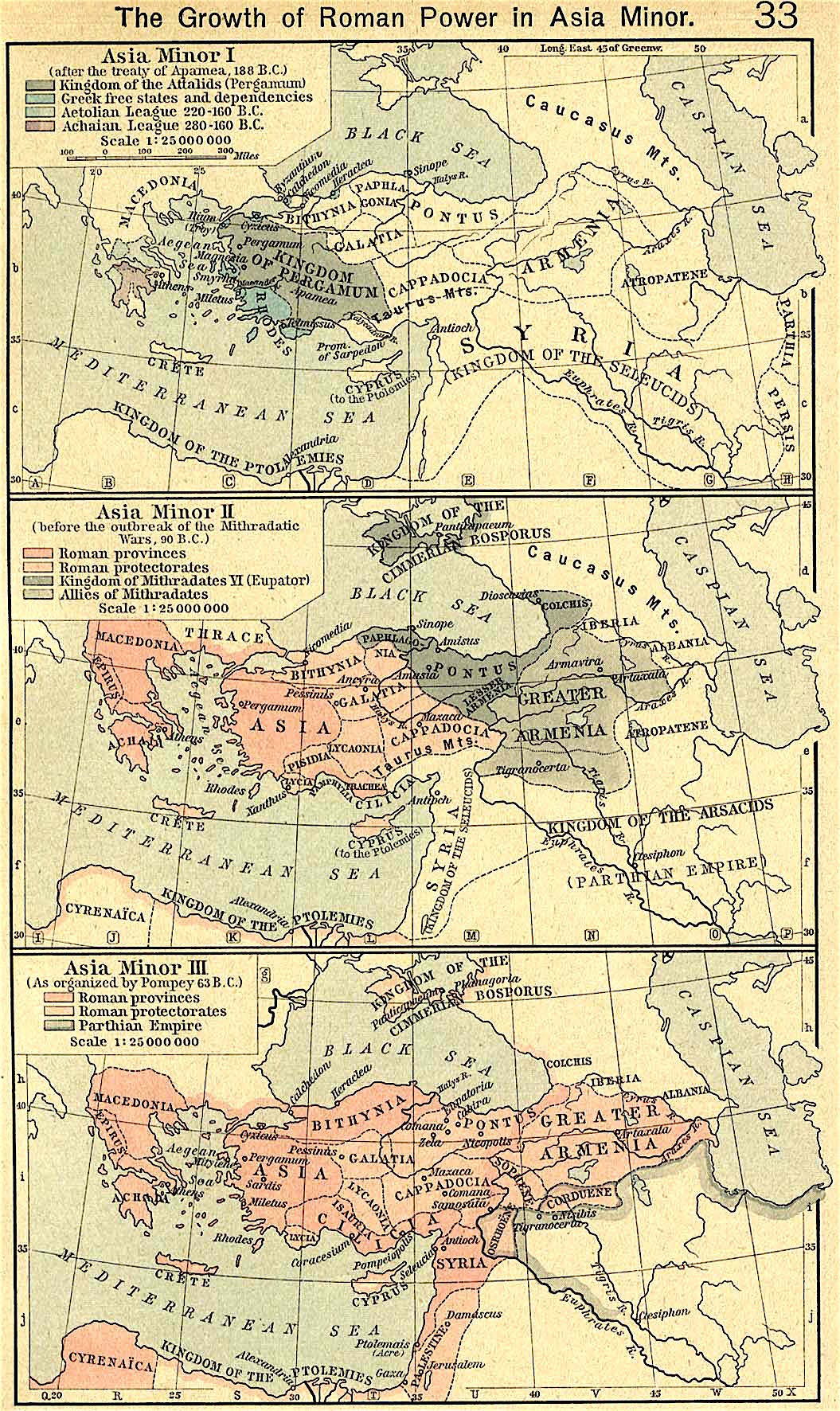
The expansion of the Roman Republic in Asia Minor from 188 BC until 63 BC

=== Roman ally ===
Prior to direct imperial rule, Cappadocia was one of the successor kingdoms of Alexander the Great's empire. The Kingdom of Cappadocia was ruled by the Ariarathid dynasty from 331 BC until 95 BC. Under Ariarathes IV, Cappadocia first came into contact with the Roman Republic as a foe allied to the Seleucid King Antiochus the Great during the Roman–Seleucid War from 192 to 188 BC.

Following Rome's victory over Antiochus, Ariarathes IV entered friendly relations with the Republic by betrothing his daughter to the king of Pergamum, a Roman ally. The Ariarathid kings would thereafter become a major ally of Rome in the East. The kingdom supported the Republic as a counterweight against the Seleucid Empire, which claimed dominion over the Cappadocian kingdom. Cappadocia would also support Rome in the Third Macedonian War against Perseus of Macedon from 171 to 166 BC. Rome's defeat of the Seleucids and Macedonia established the Republic as a major power in the eastern Mediterranean.

When King Attalus III (138–133 BC) died without an heir in 133 BC, he bequeathed his kingdom to Rome. Eumenes III claimed the Pergamon throne, occupying the territory. In 130 BC, Cappadocian king Ariarathes V supported the Roman Consul Publius Licinius Crassus Dives Mucianus in his failed attempt to overthrow Eumenes III. Both Crassus and Ariarathes V fell in battle against Eumenes III. Ariarathes V's death resulted in his minor son, Ariarathes VI, occupying the Cappadocian throne.

King Mithridates V of Pontus exerted control over Cappadocia by betrothing his daughter Laodice to Ariarathes VI. Mithridates V would later launch a military invasion of Cappadocia, forming the kingdom into a protectorate of the Kingdom of Pontus. Though nominally independent, Pontic influence over Cappadocia was continued by his son Mithridates VI of Pontus.

In 116 BC, the Cappadocian king Ariarathes VI was murdered by the Cappadocian noble Gordius on orders from Mithridates VI. Mithridates VI then installed his sister Laodice, Ariarathes VI's widow, as regent over for the infant Ariarathes VII, further solidifying Pontic control over the kingdom. After King Nicomedes III of Bithynia married Laodice, he tried to annex Cappadocia into his kingdom and deposed Ariarathes VII. Mithridates VI swiftly invaded, expelling Nicomedes III from the region, restoring his nephew Ariarathes VII to the Cappadocian throne, and returning Cappadocia to Pontus's sphere of influence.

The Pontic king would later have Ariarathes VII murdered in 101 BC, with Mirthridates VI installing his eight-year-old son Ariarathes IX on the Cappadocian throne as his puppet king. As a child, Ariarathes IX was unable to maintain control of the kingdom, with the Cappadocian nobles rebelling against his rule in 97 BC and naming Ariarathes VIII, son of the murdered Ariarathes VII, as king. Mithridates quickly put down the rebellion, exiled Arirarathes VIII, and restored his son to the Cappadocian throne.

=== Roman client kingdom (95 BC – 14 AD) ===
In response to the turmoil in Cappadocia, in 95 BC king Nicomedes III of Bithynia sent an embassy to Rome, claiming dominion over the kingdom. Mithridates VI of Pontus likewise sent an embassy to Rome, seeking Roman approval of his dominion over Cappadocia. The Roman Senate, however, did not assign the kingdom to either.

Instead, the Senate demanded both Pontus and Bithynia withdraw from Cappadocia and guarantee its independence. The Senate ordered Ariarathes IX deposed. With military support from the Roman governor of Cilicia Lucius Cornelius Sulla, Ariobarzanes I was installed as king of Cappadocia. With Ariobarzanes I installed on the throne in 95 BC, Cappadocia became a client kingdom under the Roman Republic.

In 93 BC, troops from Armenia under Tigranes the Great, son-in-law of Mithridates VI, invaded Cappadocia at the behest of the Pontic king. Tigranes dethroned Ariobarzanes I, who fled to Rome, and crowned Gordius as the new client-king of Cappadocia. With Cappadocia as a client kingdom under Armenia, Tigranes created a buffer zone between his kingdom and the expanding Roman Republic.

With Cappadocia secured, Mithridates invaded Bithynia, defeating king Nicomedes IV in 90 BC. Nicomedes IV was forced to flee to Italy. A Senatorial delegation was sent east to restore both Nicomedes IV and Ariobarzanes I to their respective kingdoms. Though the Social War was still raging in Italy, Rome was able to successfully restore both kings due to the Republic's growing influence in the region.

==== Mithridatic Wars (88–63 BC) ====
A map of Asia Minor in 89 BC at the start of the First Mithridatic War. Cappadocia, light green, is shown as a client kingdom of Pontus, dark green.

In 89 BC, after having made peace arrangement with Rome and with Ariobarzanes I restored to the Cappadocian throne, Mithridates VI again invaded Cappadocia, reinstalling his son Ariarathes IX as puppet-king under Pontic rule. Mithridates's actions in Cappadocia sparked the First Mithridatic War (89–85 BC) between Rome and Pontus and its ally Armenia.

Lucius Cornelius Sulla assumed command of the Roman war effort in 87 BC and soundly defeated Mithridates VI and his allies in 85 BC. His attention needed in Rome due to rising political challenges, Sulla imposed mild terms on Mithridates VI: Mithridates was to relinquish his control over Bithynia and Cappadocia, reinstating Ariobarzanes I and Nicomedies IV as Roman client-kings. In return, Rome allowed Mithridates VI to retain his rule over Pontus.

When Nicomedes IV died in 74 BC, he bequeathed Bithynia to the Roman Republic. His death caused a power vacuum in Asia Minor, allowing Mithridates VI to invade and conquer the leaderless kingdom. With Mirthidates VI again having designs on Roman protectorates in Asia Minor, including Cappadocia, Rome launched the Third Mithridatic War to end the Pontic threat. Dispatching Consul Lucius Licinius Lucullus to Asia, Rome drove Pontus and its ally Armenia out of Asia proper, reasserting Roman dominance over the Asian client kingdoms by 71 BC and conquering Pontus in the process. When Mithridates VI fled to Armenia, Lucullus invaded the kingdom in 69 BC.

Despite initial successes, Lucullus was unable to decisively end the war. By 66 BC, Mithridates VI and Tigranes were able to retake their respective kingdoms and Lucullus was recalled to Rome. The Senate then sent Pompey the Great to the East in order to bring the war to a close. Upon his defeat by Pompey, Mithridates VI again fled to Armenia. Tigranes, however, refused to receive him. Mithridates VI was then forced to flee north across the Black Sea to the Bosporan Kingdom under the rule of his son Machares, bringing the war to an effective end in 65 BC.

When Machares refused to launch a new war against Rome, Mithridates VI had him killed and assumed the Bosporan throne for himself. While Mithridates VI was eager to fight the Romans once more, his youngest son Pharnaces II of Pontus was not and plotted to remove his father from power. His plans were discovered, but the army, not wishing to engage Pompey and his armies, supported Pharnaces. They marched on Mithridates VI and forced their former king to take his own life in 63 BC. Pharnaces II quickly sent an embassy to Pompey with offers of submission. Pompey accepted Pharnaces II's submission and, in returned, named Pharnaces II as the Roman client king of the Bosporan Kingdom.

With Mithridates VI absent from Asia Minor, Pompey officially annexed Bithynia, Pontus, and Cilicia in the Roman Republic as provinces. Invading Armenia in 64 BC, Tigranes surrendered to Pompey and become a client kingdom of Rome. With Armenia reduced, Pompey then traveled south and officially annexed the Roman client kingdom of Syria in the Republic as a province by deposing its king Antiochus XIII Asiaticus. Following the death of Ariobarzanes I, Pompey, as one of his final acts in the East before returning to Rome, installed his son Ariobarzanes II as the new Roman client king of Cappadocia.

Ariobarzanes II reigned as Rome's client king until 51 BC when he was assassinated by forces loyal to the neighboring Parthian Empire. The Roman Senate declared his son Ariobarzanes III as his rightful successor and, with military backing from the Roman governor of Cilicia Marcus Tullius Cicero, installed him upon the Cappadocian throne. In 50 BC, Ariobarzanes III, aided by Cicero, discovered a plot by Athenais Philostorgos II, Ariobarzanes III's mother, to depose him and install his younger brother Ariarathes X as king. Together, Cicero and Ariobarzanes III banished Athenais, who was a daughter of Mithridates VI, from Cappadocia.

==== Roman civil wars ====
Cappadocia became an important player during the Roman Republican civil wars. When Julius Caesar crossed the Rubicon River in 49 BC and started his civil war, many members of the Roman Senate under the leadership of Pompey fled to the East. Cappadocian King Ariobarzanes III initially supported Pompey against Caesar, thankful for Pompey's support of his father years earlier. However, following Caesar's victory over Pompey at the Battle of Pharsulus and Pompey's subsequent assassination in 48 BC, Ariobarzanes III declared his loyalty to Caesar. Caesar subsequently named Gnaeus Domitius Calvinus as Roman governor of Asia to act as his chief lieutenant in Asia Minor while he traveled to Ptolemaic Egypt.

With the Romans were distracted by civil war, Pharnaces II, the Roman client king of the Bosporan Kingdom and the youngest son of Mithridates VI, decided to seize the opportunity and conquered Colchis and Lesser Armenia (territories of the Roman province of Pontus). The rulers of Cappadocia and Galatia, Ariobarzanes III and Deiotarus respectively, appealed to Calvinus for protection and soon the Roman forces sought battle with Pharnaces II. They met at the Battle of Nicopolis in eastern Anatolia, where Pharnaces II defeated the Roman army and overran much of Cappadocia, Pontus, and Bithynia.

After the defeating the Ptolemaic forces at the Battle of the Nile, Caesar left Egypt in 47 BC and travelled through Syria, Cilicia, and Cappadocia to face Pharnaces II. As Pharnaces II gained word of Caesar's approach with his veteran army, he sent envoys to seek a peace, which Caesar refused. Caesar met Pharnaces II at the Battle of Zela, decisively defeating the Pontic king and reassessing Roman dominance over Asia Minor. Upon his return to the Bosporan Kingdom, Pharnaces II was assassinated by his son-in-law Asander. In return, Caesar named Asander as the kingdom's new Roman client king. Caesar then incorporated Lesser Armenia into Cappadocia to serve as a buffer from Rome's interests in Asia Minor against future Eastern aggression.

Caesar was assassinated on March 15, 44 BC, by the members of the Roman Senate, Marcus Junius Brutus and Gaius Cassius Longinus chief among them. The "Liberators" then fled from Italy, assuming command of the Republic's eastern provinces and the eastern client kingdoms, including Cappadocia, in 43 BC. When Ariobarzanes III objected to the level of Roman intervention into his kingdom, Cassius had him executed and installed his younger brother Ariarathes X upon the Cappadocian throne in 42 BC. Later that year, following the defeat of Brutus and Cassius by the Second Triumvirate at the Battle of Philippi, Triumvir Mark Antony assumed command of the Eastern provinces and client kingdoms. In 36 BC, Antony executed Ariarathes X and installed Archelaus as the new Cappadocian client king.

The Second Triumvirate expired in 33 BC, ending Antony's legal right to govern the Eastern half of the Republic. With the Triumvirate lapsed, the struggle for dominance between Antony and Octavian intensified. As Octavian built up his support in the West, Antony drew ever closer to Egyptian Queen Cleopatra. When Octavian declared war on Egypt, Antony, supported by the Eastern client kingdoms (including Cappadocia), went to Egypt's aid against Octavian. Octavian's victory over Antony at the Battle of Actium in 31 BC ensured Octavian's position as undisputed master of the Roman world. Traveling through Asia Minor and the Levant from Greece to Egypt, Cappadocian king Archelaus and the other Eastern client kings declared their loyal to Octavian. In return, Octavian allowed him and the other client kings to remain on their thrones.

When Octavian became "Augustus" as the first Roman Emperor in 27 BC, Cappadocia become an important and trusted Eastern client kingdom, maintaining its tributary independence under the reorganized Roman Empire. Archelaus became an important client king for Augustus' Eastern policy. Augustus considered Archelaus as a loyal ruler, making no commitment to convert Cappadocia into a direct province. As a reward for his loyalty, in 25 BC, Augustus assigned to Archelaus the territories of Cilicia along the eastern Mediterranean Sea and Lesser Armenia along the Black Sea. Augustus gave Archelaus these additional territories in order to eliminate piracy in the Eastern Mediterranean and to build a buffer between Rome and the Parthian Empire.

=== Roman province ===
==== During the Principate ====
Cappadocia remained an important and trusted eastern client kingdom under Emperor Augustus's reign. Rome's policy towards Cappadocia changed, however, following Augustus's death in 14 AD and the reign of Emperor Tiberius. Years earlier, Tiberius had been slighted by Archelaus when the Cappadocian king showed favor to Gaius Caesar, one of Augustus's grandsons and chief heirs. While Tiberius was in retirement on the Greek island of Rhodes from 6 BC to 2 AD, though the nominal commander of the Eastern half of the Empire, in 1 BC Archelaus recognized Gaius Caesar, then a military commander subordinate to Tiberius, as Augustus's true representative. Though Gaius Caesar was Augustus's preferred successor, his death in 4 AD while on military campaign in Armenia forced Augustus to adopt Tiberius and name him as his successor.

Assuming the Imperial throne in 14 AD, Tiberius set about a change in Rome's eastern policy. Wanting direct access to Cappadocia's resources and seeking to reduce Archelaus, Tiberius summoned Archelaus to Rome in 17 AD. At the time, Archelaus had governed Cappadocia as Rome's client king for over fifty-years. When he arrived in Rome, Tiberius accused Archelaus of harboring revolutionary schemes and imprisoned him, where he died of natural causes soon thereafter.

Sending his adoptive son Germanicus to oversee Rome's affairs in the East, Tiberius then annexed Cappadocia directly into the Empire by reducing the kingdom into a Roman province. Tiberius awarded rule of the Roman client kingdom of Armenia to Archelaus's step-son Artaxias III and rule of the Roman client kingdom of Cilicia to Archelaus's son Archelaus II. Arriving in the East in 18 AD, Germanicus solidified Roman control over Cappadocia and the region. Under orders from the Emperor, Germanicus also annexing Cappadocia's southeastern neighbor, the client kingdom of Commagene, into the Empire as a part of the province of Syria.

For much the 1st century AD, Polemon II of Pontus ruled as a Roman client king over the remnants of the former kingdom of Pontus (Lesser Armenia and Colchis). However, in 62 AD, the Roman Emperor Nero deposed him and annexed his kingdom into direct imperial ruled by incorporating his former territory into Cappadocia.

Bording the Euphrates river to the east, Cappadocia was the most eastern province of the Empire. Its capital, Caesarea (modern Kayseri), was located in more central Anatolia, further back from the Parthian frontier. Upon annexation, the province was governed by a governor of Equestrian rank with the title Procurator. The Procurators commanded only auxiliary military units and looked to the Senatorial ranked Imperial Legate of Syria for direction.

Following the Roman civil war of 69, the Emperor Vespasian upgraded the province to Senatorial rank, making its governor equal in rank with that of Syria. As a Senatorial province during the middle of the second century AD, Cappadocia retained a permanent military garrison of three legions and several auxiliary units, totally over 28,000 troops. The military presence in Cappadocia served as an important response force against invasions from the Parthian Empire and allowed the Roman's easy intervention into the affairs of their client kingdom of Armenia.

The first Cappadocian to be admitted to the Roman Senate was Tiberius Claudius Gordianus, during the reign of Marcus Aurelius during the middle second century AD.

==== During the Dominate ====
Following the provincial reorganization of Diocletian, the Pontic and Armenian territories were split off, and the province was reduced to the region of Cappadocia proper. It was headed by a consularis and came under the Diocese of Pontus. The province was the site of a great number of imperial estates, as contemporary legislation testifies. On the highway between Constantinople and Antioch Caesarea saw a significant number of imperial visits (Itineraries of the Roman emperors, 337–361); Valens (363–378) was particularly frequent. The future emperor Julian spent his early years at a remote estate, Macellum. Class divisions between the landowning class and the urban and rural poor were extreme, as was also the climate of this upland plateau.

In the late 330s, the eastern half of the province was split off to form the provinces of Armenia Prima and Armenia Secunda. In 371, emperor Valens split off the south-western region around Tyana, which became Cappadocia Secunda under a praeses, while the remainder became Cappadocia Prima, still under a consularis.

Cappadocia during this period saw a generation of Christian thinkers, the most prominent of whom were Basil of Caesarea, his close friend Gregory of Nazianzos, his younger brother Gregory of Nyssa, and a cousin of the former, Amphilochios of Iconium.

=== Later developments ===
In the period 535–553, under emperor Justinian I, the two provinces were rejoined into a single unit under a proconsul. Throughout late Roman times, the region was subject to raids by the Isaurians, leading to the fortification of local cities. During the war of 602–628, the region was briefly captured by the Sassanid Empire. Following the eruption of the Muslim conquests, repeated raids devastated the region, which became a frontier zone under the new Byzantine themata of Anatolikon and Armeniakon.

== See also ==
- Roman governors of Cappadocia
