= Ariarathes =

Ariarathes (Ancient Greek: Ἀριαράθης, Ariaráthēs) was the name of ten Hellenistic kings of Cappadocia in Anatolia, between the 4th and 1st centuries BC. They are:

- Ariarathes I of Cappadocia, ruled 331 or 330–322 BC, son of the Cappadocian satrap Ariamnes I
- Ariarathes II of Cappadocia, ruled 301–280 BC, satrap and king of Cappadocia, son of Holophernes and adopted son of Ariarathes I
- Ariarathes III of Cappadocia, reigned 262 or 255–220 BC, son of Ariamnes
- Ariarathes IV of Cappadocia, reigned 220–163 BC, son of Ariarathes III
- Ariarathes V of Cappadocia, reigned 163–130 BC or 126 BC, son of Ariarathes IV
- Ariarathes VI of Cappadocia, 130–111 BC, youngest son of Ariarathes V
- Ariarathes VII of Cappadocia, reigned 116–101 BC or 111 BC–100 BC), son of Ariarathes VI
- Ariarathes VIII of Cappadocia, reigned c. 101 – c. 96 BC and 95 BC–95 BC), king of Cappadocia, second son of Ariarathes VI
- Ariarathes IX of Cappadocia, reigned c. 101–89 BC or 96 BC–95 BC, made king of Cappadocia by his father Mithridates VI, king of Pontus
- Ariarathes X of Cappadocia, reigned c. 42 BC – 36 BC, became king after his brother Ariobarzanes III Philoromaios

== See also ==
- List of rulers of Cappadocia
