= Athenais Philostorgos II =

Queen of Cappadocia and princess of Pontus

Athenais Philostorgos II (Greek: η Άθηναἷς Φιλόστοργος Β), also known as Athenais Philostorgus II or Athenais of Pontus, was a princess of the Kingdom of Pontus, and queen of Cappadocia by marriage to King Ariobarzanes II Philopator. Her name in Greek translates to "Athenais the loving one".

== Life ==
The child of King Mithridates VI of Pontus from his second marriage to the Anatolian Greek Macedonian noblewoman and Pontian Queen Monime, she was a princess of Persian and Greek Macedonian ancestry. Born and raised in the Kingdom of Pontos, her parents gave her a traditional ancient Greek name.

Athenais married the Cappadocian Prince and later King Ariobarzanes II Philopator, who was of Persian and Greek descent.

=== Queen consort ===
Ariobarzanes II succeeded his father as King in 63 BC-62 BC, when his father Ariobarzanes I Philoromaios abdicated his throne. When Ariobarzanes II became king, Athenais became Cappadocian queen, inheriting the honorific title of "Philostorgos", which was the honorific surname of the mother of Ariobarzanes II, Athenais Philostorgos I.

Athenais was related to the previous kings and monarchs of Cappadocia. Her paternal aunt Laodice of Cappadocia was a queen, her paternal cousins, Ariarathes VI, Ariarathes VII, and Ariarathes VIII, and her paternal half-brother Ariarathes IX all served as previous kings of Cappadocia. Through her Seleucid and paternal lineage, Athenais was related to the ancestors of Ariarathes VI.

Ariobarzanes II reigned as king of Cappadocia from c. 63 BC-62 BC until his assassination in c. 51 BC. There are various surviving honorific inscriptions dedicated to Athenais. During their marriage, Athenais bore Ariobarzanes II two sons: Ariobarzanes III Eusebes Philoromaios and Ariarathes X Eusebes Philadelphos. Her sons would serve as among the last kings of Cappadocia.

The name "Ariobarzanes" was not only a name from her husband's family, but also a name from her own family. Athenais had three paternal political ancestors of that name: Ariobarzanes of Phrygia, who flourished 5th century BC, Ariobarzanes II of Cius, who flourished 4th century BC, and the previous Pontian King Ariobarzanes of Pontus.

=== Queen mother ===
After the death of her husband, her first son succeeded his father as King and she became a widow who never married again. Athenais became known as the ‘Queen-Mother’ of Cappadocia.

During the rule of Ariobarzanes III, Roman Governor of Cilicia Marcus Tullius Cicero warned the King that Athenais could be a potential enemy to him. Cicero's warning was based on Athenais’ jealousy, about two nobles called Methras and Athenaeus. They were ministers and favorites of her first son, and they were, through Athenais’ jealousy, driven out from the Cappadocian Royal Court. However, Methras and Athenaeus were later recalled by Cicero.

Athenais’ jealousy was a part of her failed plot to depose her first son from his throne and put her second son in his place. Cicero and Ariobarzanes III caught Athenais out and Ariobarzanes III was very saddened by his mother's actions. Ariabarzanes III removed his mother from power and her fate afterward is unknown.

== Sources ==
- Syme, R., Birley, A.R., Anatolica: studies in Strabo, Oxford University Press, 1995
- Hornblower, S., Spawforth A., The Oxford Classical Dictionary, Oxford University Press, 1996
- Mayor, A. The Poison King: the life and legend of Mithradates, Rome's deadliest enemy, Princeton University Press, 2009
- Muirhead, J.H, Cicero M.T, Letters of Cicero, READ BOOKS, 2010
