= Asiatic Vespers =

Massacre which occurred before the First Mithridatic War

- Part of the First Mithridatic War
- Asia Minor and surrounding region at the start of the First Mithridatic War, in 89 BC
- Location: Asia Minor
- Date: c. early 88 BC
- Attack type: Genocide
- Deaths: approx. 80,000–150,000
- Victims: Romans and Latin-speaking peoples
- Perpetrator: Mithridates VI Eupator
- Motive: Purge Asia Minor of Roman influence

The Asiatic Vespers (also known as the Asian Vespers, Ephesian Vespers, or the Vespers of 88 BC) were massacres of Roman and other Latin-speaking peoples living in parts of western Anatolia c. early 88 BC by forces loyal to Mithridates VI Eupator, ruler of the Kingdom of Pontus, who orchestrated the massacre in an attempt to rid Asia Minor of Roman influence. An estimated 80,000 people were killed during the episode. The incident served as the casus belli or immediate cause of the First Mithridatic War between the Roman Republic and the Kingdom of Pontus. Some scholars and historians consider these massacres to be a case of genocide.

== Background ==
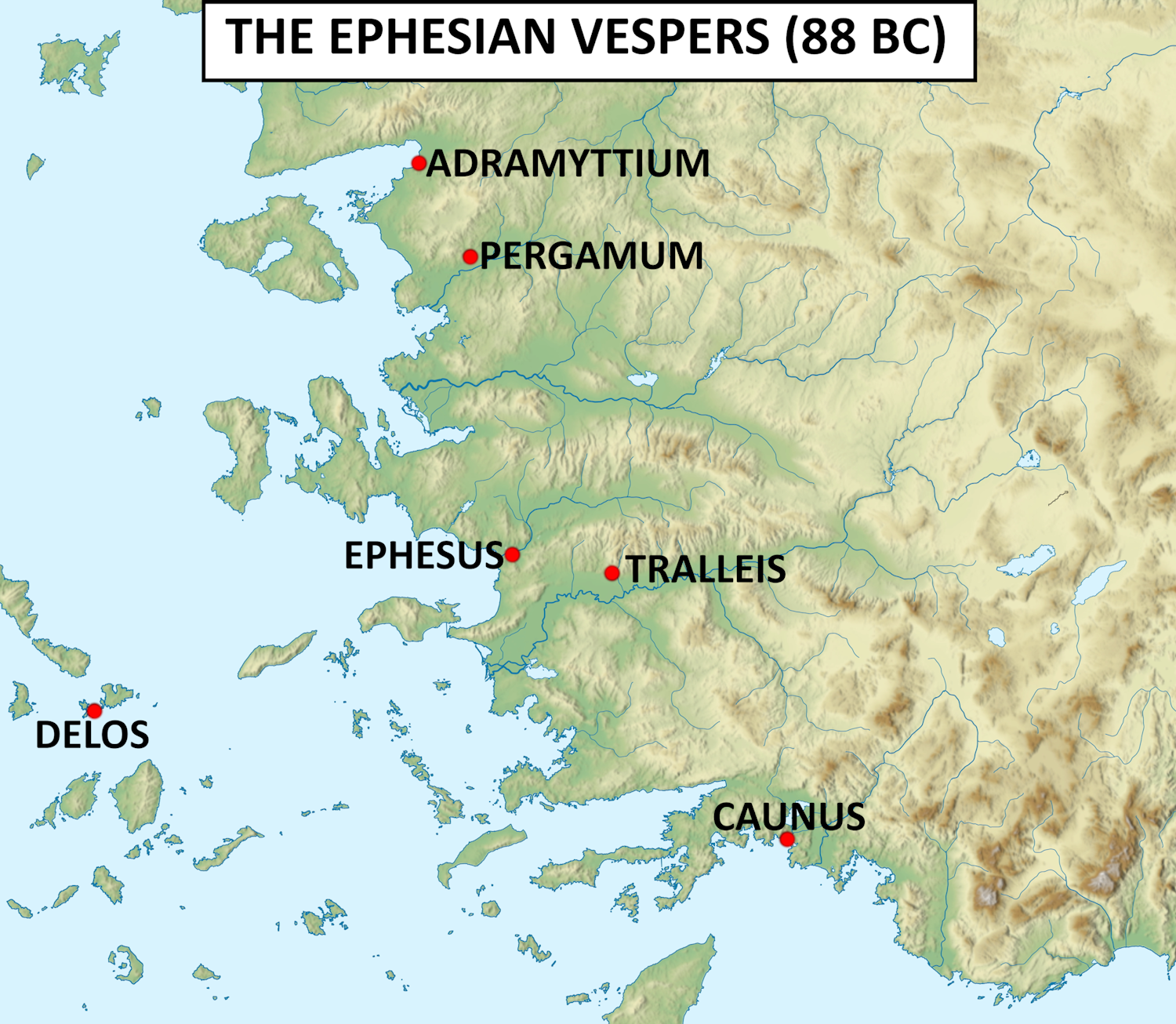
Map of the known massacre locations.

In the 100s BC, Mithridates had continued to avoid confrontation with the Roman republic, which itself was occupied in the Jugurthine and Cimbric wars. However, due to Mithridates' subjugation of Armenia and other territories along the Black Sea, Roman attention fell on Pontus. With Nicomedes III of Bithynia, Mithridates saw an opportunity in 108–107 BC and partitioned Paphlagonia. A Roman embassy protested and demanded the two kings to withdraw, but was ignored.

A few years later, c. 102 BC, Nicomedes and Mithridates came into a dispute over Cappadocia: Nicomedes sent a garrison into the country and married its dowager queen, Laodice. After Mithridates attempted to assassinate the king of Cappadocia, Ariarathes VII Philometor, Ariarathes went to war. Mithridates invaded with a large army and killed Ariarathes, installing his own son – Ariarathes IX – c. 101 BC. Mithridates attempted to sway the Romans into accepting his conquests but was largely unsuccessful. After a revolution overthrew Mithridates' son in 97 BC, Nicomedes appealed to Rome for support. Mithridates did so also, but the Romans – probably finding the matter too difficult to untangle – ordered both kings to leave Cappadocia and to allow its nobility to choose a new king. It then sent the governor of Cilicia, then Lucius Cornelius Sulla, to install the new king – Ariobarzanes I – into power.

When Rome became occupied in the Social war, Mithridates took the opportunity to ally with Tigranes I of Armenia. With the death of Nicomedes III and the accession of his son Nicomedes IV, Mithridates and Tigranes unseated Ariobarzanes from Cappadocia and, after an assassination attempt failed, expelled Nicomedes IV from Bithynia. When news reached Rome, the senate decreed that both kings were to be restored and dispatched Manius Aquillius to lead a commission. Facing Roman demands for withdrawal, Mithridates complied and had his own puppet king of Bithynia executed. However, the reinstalled kings of Cappadocia and Bithynia were faced with a Roman bill for their restoration. Unable to find the funds, the Romans encouraged them to invade Pontus. This was a "disastrous and fatal miscalculation".

Mithridates responded to the provocation by invading Cappadocia and Bithynia. Manius Aquillius attempted to raise troops from Bithynia and also called upon reinforcements under Gaius Cassius, the proconsul in Asia, and Quintus Oppius, proconsul in Cilicia. After defeating Nicomedes IV, Mithridates then defeated Aquillius in Bithynia, forcing Cassius to withdraw to the Aegean and Rhodes. Proceeding south, Mithridates induced the citizens of Laodicea, where Oppius was present, to surrender the proconsul. By the middle of 89 BC, Mithridates had defeated four allied armies and conquered most of Roman Asia. He revelled in his victory as he remitted all taxes for five years and appointed satraps and overseers for the conquered territories.

News reached Rome of Mithridates' victories and the collapse of Roman rule in Asia in the autumn of 89 BC. Distracted by the Social war, the Romans immediately declared war on Mithridates but moved slowly in forming up forces. The consul of 88 BC, Lucius Cornelius Sulla, was given the command against Mithridates and it took him some eighteen months to assemble five legions.

== Massacre ==
The massacres were a calculated response to the Roman declaration of war. They were meant to force cities to take a side: "no city that did his bidding now could ever hope to be received back into Roman allegiance". The killings took place probably in the first half of the year 88 BC. Valerius Maximus and Memnon indicate a death toll of approximately 80,000; Plutarch claims – "less credibly" – a death toll of 150,000. The reported numbers, according to fragments of Dio, are however probably exaggerated. They were planned, with Mithridates writing secretly to regional satraps and leaders to kill all Italian residents (along with wives, children, and freedmen of Italian birth) thirty days after the day of writing.

Mithridates furthermore offered freedom to slaves which informed on their Italian masters and debt relief to those who slew their creditors. Assassins and informers would share with the Pontic treasury half the properties of those who were killed. Ephesus, Pergamon, Adramyttion, Caunus, Tralles, Nysa, and the island of Chios were all scenes of atrocities. Many of these cities were under the control of tyrants, and many of the inhabitants enthusiastically fell upon their Italian neighbours, who were blamed "for the prevailing climate of aggressive greed[,] acquisitiveness[,] and... malicious litigation".

== Roman response ==
The declaration of war was immediate, but implementation of the mandate was delayed by an unrelated civil war already ongoing within the Roman Republic. Sulla received it first from the Senate. After he had taken command of the legions at Nola, a Roman Assembly passed a law stripping him of his authority in favor of Gaius Marius. At the instigation of his men, he marched on Rome to assert the authority of the Senate. Assured of its and his authority, he crossed the Adriatic with minimal troops and no heavy warships, after one year of doing nothing on the eastern front.

Meanwhile, Mithridates had created a large fleet that scoured the Aegean of Romans. Pontic forces occupied many vacated parts of the Hellenic world. Mithridates subverted the city of Athens, making use of his partisans there, including the peripatetic philosophers. He could not, however, despite maximum effort, take the port of Rhodes, as the Rhodians were master mariners, on whose ships the Romans had redesigned their own. When Sulla's men finally arrived to conduct a siege of Athens, all mainland Greece had rallied to the Roman cause. A series of conflicts known as the Mithridatic Wars followed.

== Dating of the massacre ==
The precise date of the massacre is disputed by modern historians, who have written about the question at length. A. N. Sherwin-White places the event in late 89 or early 88 BC. Ernst Badian, saying "precision seems impossible", places it in the first half of 88 BC, no later than the middle of that year. The name "Vêpres éphésiennes" was coined in 1890 by historian Théodore Reinach to describe the massacre, making a retrospective analogy with the Sicilian Vespers of 1282. Subsequent historians have adopted some variation of the phrase, using Vespers as a euphemism for "massacre".

=== Genocide claims ===
Some scholars and historians consider these massacres to be a case of genocide.
