= List of monarchs of Cappadocia =

Hellenistic princes and kings of Cappadocia

This article lists the Hellenistic princes and kings of Cappadocia, an ancient region in central Anatolia.

== Independent princes of Cappadocia, 331 BC – 250s BC ==
- Ariarathes I, 331–322 BC

The hitherto satrap, Ariarathes I managed to keep control of most or all Cappadocia, as independent prince leading the resistance against conquerors, even after Alexander the Great's conquest of the Persians; however, in 322 BC, he was crucified by Perdiccas, Alexander's general and (after Alexander's death) regent.

- temporary suppression of independence, governors of Macedon Empire held the country
  - governor Eumenes
  - diadoch Antigonos, firstly satrap of Phrygia and then Regent. He was killed in Ipsos in 301 BCE.

Perdiccas gave Cappadocia to Eumenes, Alexander's former secretary. However, during the instability of the ongoing Wars of the Diadochi, Eumenes was killed, and then the regent Antigonos was killed.

Ariarathes I's adopted son, Ariarathes II, managed to re-secure some of his inheritance, namely the mere Upper Cappadocia around Mazaca, and became Prince of Cappadocia (while accepting Seleucid suzerainty). The Lower Cappadocia was lost forever to Kingdom of Pontos which emerged since 301 BCE in the coast of Black Sea, and proclaimed Kingdom in circa 281 BCE.

- Ariarathes II, 301–280 BC
- Ariaramnes, 280–230 BC

== Kings of Cappadocia, 250s BC – 17 AD ==
Possibly continuing a while under weak Seleucid suzerainty, title recognized as Kings:

- Ariarathes III, 255–220 BC, started as co-ruler with his father Ariamnes II
- Ariarathes IV Eusebes, 220–163 BC
- Ariarathes V Eusebes Philopator, 163–130 BC
- Orophernes, 157 BC
- Ariarathes VI Epiphanes Philopator, 130–116 BC
- Ariarathes VII Philometor, 116–101 BC
- Ariarathes VIII, 101–96 BC
- Ariarathes IX, 100-85 BC
- Ariobarzanes I Philoromaios, 95–c. 63 BC
- Ariobarzanes II Philopator, c. 63–51 BC
- Ariobarzanes III Eusebes Philoromaios, 51–42 BC
- Ariarathes X Eusebes Philadelphos, 42–36 BC
- Archelaus, 36 BC–17 AD

== Family tree of kings of Cappadocia ==
Camissares satrap of Cappadocia
Datames satrap of Cappadocia
Ariamnes satrap of Cappadocia; ARIARATHIDS
Ariarathes I satrap 350-331 BC, later king of Cappadocia; 331-322 BC	Holophernes
Ariarathes II king of Cappadocia; 301-280 BC	Antiochus II Theos
Ariamnes king of Cappadocia; 280-230 BC	Seleucus II Callinicus
Ariarathes III king of Cappadocia; 255-220 BC	Stratonice daughter of Antiochus II Theos	Antiochus III the Great
Ariarathes IV king of Cappadocia; 220-163 BC	Antiochis
Stratonice ∞ 1. Eumenes II of Pergamon; 2. Attalus II of Pergamon	Orophernes Nicephorus king of Cappadocia; 157 BC	Ariarathes V Eusebes Philopator king of Cappadocia; 163-130 BC	Nyssa daughter of Pharnaces I of Pontus	Mithridates V king of Pontus
Ariarathes VI Epiphanes Philopater king of Cappadocia; 130-116 BC	Laodice	Mithridates VI king of Pontus	Monime	Ariobarzanes I Philoromaios king of Cappadocia; 95-c.63 BC; ARIOBARZANIDS	Athenais Philostorgos I
Nysa ∞ Nicomedes III of Bithynia	Ariarathes VII Philometor king of Cappadocia; 116-101 BC	Ariarathes VIII Epiphanes king of Cappadocia; 101-96 BC	(illeg.) Ariarathes IX Eusebes Philopator king of Cappadocia; 101-96 BC	Athenais Philostorgos II	Ariobarzanes II Philopator king of Cappadocia c.63-c.51 BC	Isias Philostorgos ∞ Antiochus I of Commagene
Ariobarzanes III king of Cappadocia; 51-c.42 BC	Ariarathes X Eusebes Philadelphos king of Cappadocia c.42-36 BC
