= Ariarathid dynasty =

Hereditary Cappadocian dynasty of Iranian origin (331-96 BC)

Ariarathid
- Country: Cappadocia
- Founded: 331 BC
- Current head: Extinct
- Final ruler: Ariarathes IX
- Dissolution: 96 BC

The Ariarathid dynasty was a hereditary dynasty of Cappadocia of Iranian origin.

Ariarathes I was the last Achaemenid satrap of the satrapy of Northern Cappadocia. He resisted Alexander the Great's invasion, and continued to fight after the fall of the Achaemenid Empire. In 322 BC he was defeated and killed by Perdiccas, then the regent of Alexander's empire.

Ariarathes II was the nephew of Ariarathes I. After the death of his uncle he fled to Armenia. With the aid of the king of Armenia in 301 BC, but ruled subordinate to the Seleucid Empire.

Ariarathes was succeeded by his son, Ariaramnes in 280 BC. Ariaramnes rebelled and achieved independence from the Hellenistic Seleucid Empire. However, he remained on friendly terms with the Seleucids, and was awarded the title of "king" by Antiochus II Theos.

Ariarathes VIII was the last descendant of the Cappadocian royal line. He died in 96 BC, and was succeeded by Ariarathes IX, son of King Mithridates VI of Pontus. He was forced to abdicate and was restored twice, but was finally deposed by the Roman Senate in 85 BC. He was said to have been poisoned by his father.

== Kings of Cappadocia ==
- Ariarathes I 331 – 322 BC
- Ariarathes II 301 – 280 BC
- Ariaramnes 280 – 230 BC
- Ariarathes III 255 – 220 BC
- Ariarathes IV 220 – 163 BC
- Ariarathes V 163 – 130 BC
- Ariarathes VI 130 – 116 BC
- Ariarathes VII 116 – 101 BC
- Ariarathes VIII 101 – 96 BC
- Ariarathes IX 101 – 96 BC

== Sources ==
- Boyce, Mary; Grenet, Frantz (1991). Beck, Roger (ed.). A History of Zoroastrianism, Zoroastrianism under Macedonian and Roman Rule. Leiden: Brill. ISBN 978-9004293915.
- McGing, Brian (2012). "Ariarathes". In Hornblower, Simon; Spawforth, Antony; Eidinow, Esther (eds.). The Oxford Classical Dictionary (4 ed.). Oxford: Oxford University Press. ISBN 978-0199545568.
- Mørkholm, Otto (1991). Westermark, Ulla; Grierson, Philip (eds.). Early Hellenistic Coinage from the Accession of Alexander to the Peace of Apamaea (336-188 B.C.). Oxford: Oxford University Press. ISBN 978-0521395045.
- Raditsa, Leo (1983). "Iranians in Asia Minor". In Yarshater, Ehsan (ed.). The Cambridge History of Iran, Vol. 3 (1): The Seleucid, Parthian and Sasanian periods. Cambridge University Press. ISBN 978-1139054942.
- Shahbazi, A. Shapur (1986). "Ariyāramna". Encyclopaedia Iranica, Vol. II, Fasc. 4. pp. 410–411.
- Weiskopf, Michael (1990). "Cappadocia". Encyclopaedia Iranica, Vol. IV, Fasc. 7–8. pp. 780–786.
