= Kingdom of Cappadocia =

Iranian kingdom in Asia Minor (331 BC-17 AD)

- 331 BC–17 AD
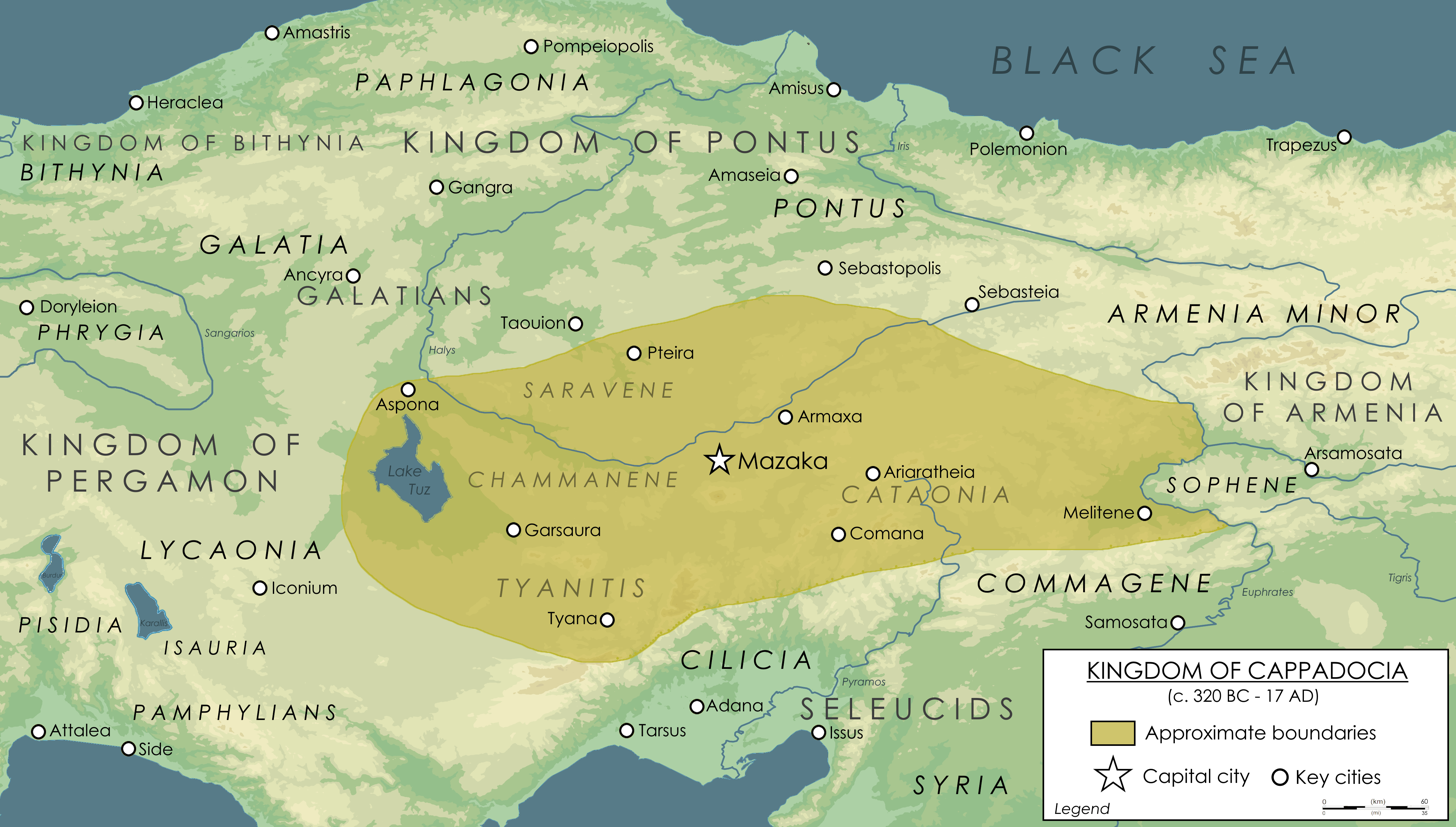
- Kingdom of Cappadocia at its peak during the reign of Ariarathes V (163-130 BC)
- Status: Subject of the Kingdom of Pontus and Seleucid Empire; Client kingdom of the Roman Republic and Roman Empire (95 BCE–17 AD)
- Capital: Mazaca (modern-day Kayseri, Turkey)
- Common languages: Greek (official); Old Persian (dynastic); Cappadocian language (regional); Aramaic (initially used on coinage)
- Religion: Syncretic, (Greek polytheism, Anatolian, and Persian gods); Zoroastrianism; Judaism
- Government: Monarchy
- Basileus
  - 331 – 322 BC (First Ariarathid king): Ariarathes I
  - 96 – c. 63 BC (First Ariobarzanid king): Ariobarzanes
  - 36 BC – 17 AD (last king): Archelaus
- History
  - Founded by Ariarathes I: 331 BC
  - Ariarathes IX deposed, Ariobarzanes I installed with military support from Sulla: 95 BC
  - Ariarathes X deposed, Archelaus installed by Marc Antony: 36 BC
  - Annexed by the Roman Empire under Emperor Tiberius.: 17 AD
Preceded by	Succeeded by
Antigonid empire; [[Seleucid Empire]]	Cappadocia (Roman province)

Cappadocia (Greek: Καππαδοκία) was a Hellenistic-era Iranian kingdom centered in the historical region of Cappadocia in Asia Minor (present-day central Turkey).

It developed from the former Achaemenid satrapy of Cappadocia, and it was founded by its last satrap, Ariarathes (later Ariarathes I). Throughout its history, it was ruled by three families in succession: the House of Ariarathes (331–96 BC), the House of Ariobarzanes (96–36 BC), and lastly that of Archelaus (36 BC–17 AD). The Cappadocian kings Hellenized various aspects of the kingdom on purpose. In 17 AD, following the death of Archelaus, during the reign of Roman emperor Tiberius (14–37 AD), the kingdom was incorporated as a Roman province.

== Origins and history ==
Under the Achaemenids, the "Iranization" of Asia Minor had been significant, and a large Iranian presence had been established in western Asia Minor, Pontus and Cappadocia. Ariarathes had been satrap of Cappadocia for 19 years and a loyal supporter of the Achaemenid kings. By blood, he was related to the ruling Achaemenid house ("Cyrus and Darius’ Seven") as well as other satraps. When Alexander the Great invaded Cappadocia as part of his conquest of the Persian Empire, he appointed two temporary governors. For the Iranians in Asia Minor, "as perhaps everywhere", the fall of the Achaemenids "meant crisis". With the victory of Alexander and the emergence of Hellenistic successor kings, the Iranians in Caria and "probably throughout western Asia Minor" eventually started to adapt themselves to the changing situation. The Iranian presence to the west of the Halys River thus slowly started to fade. However, to east of the Halys River, things went differently. The Cappadocians had shown opposition to the invading Macedonians "from the beginning". After the defense of Halicarnassus, the Cappadocians participated in the Battle of Gaugamela (331 BCE) against Alexander, and even after the battle, they "rose up in his rear".

Unlike the Iranians in Caria and "probably throughout western Asia Minor", the Iranian aristocracy to the east of the Halys River, in Cappadocia and Pontus, declared independence, "in defiance of the Macedonians". Ariarathes I managed to assume power in Cappadocia, becoming the first king of the newly established Kingdom of Cappadocia. Ariarathes's line would provide the first ten kings of the kingdom. After a period of Seleucid overlordship, the Cappadocian Kingdom gained its independence during the reign of Ariarathes III (c. 255-220 BC). The Ariarathid dynasty was abolished by the early course of the 1st century BC by the ruler of the Kingdom of Pontus, the infamous Mithridates VI (Eupator), this in an attempt to fully subdue the Cappadocian Kingdom. However, in "conflict" with the interests of the Roman Republic, the Romans supported the Cappadocians to choose a new king; this came to be another Iranian nobleman, namely Ariobarzanes I. After the civil war in Rome, the Romans started to interfere more directly in Cappadocian affairs; in 36 BC, Marcus Antonius appointed Archelaus, a local noble, to the Cappadocian throne. When, at an old age, Tiberius summoned him to Rome, he died there of natural causes; Cappadocia was subsequently incorporated as a fully functioning Roman province. Due to the kingdom's perilous location amongst powerful neighbors, the kings were often involved in beneficial marriage alliances, such as with the Mithridatic dynasty as well as the Seleucid dynasty.

Strabo, who wrote during the time of Augustus (r. 63 BCE-14 AD), almost three hundred years after the fall of the Achaemenid Persian Empire, records only traces of Persians in western Asia Minor; however, he considered Cappadocia "almost a living part of Persia".

== Religion ==
Following the Macedonian conquests, the Persian colonists in Cappadocia as well as elsewhere were cut off from their co-religionists in Iran proper. Strabo, who observed them in the Cappadocian Kingdom in the first century BCE, records (XV.3.15) that these "fire kindlers" possessed many "holy places of the Persian Gods", as well as fire temples. The kingdom's domains possessed numerous sanctuaries and temples of various Iranian gods and deities, as well as Iranized deities. On their significant importance, numerous sanctuaries and deities of this category were noted by Strabo. Some of these are Anahita at Castabala, the magus Sagarios at Ariaramneia, and Ahura Mazda at Arebsum. In enclosures, known as Pyraitheia, there was worship in the name of the Zoroastrian religion. Regarding these Pyraitheia, he furthermore relates that "... in their midst there is an altar, on which there is a large quantity of ashes and where the magi keep the fire ever burning."

=== Judaism ===
The frst known Jewish settlement within Cappadocia dates back to the 2nd Century BC when King Ariarathes of Cappadocia was asked by the Romans to maintain friendly relations with the Jews under the treaties between the Hasmonean Dynasty and Rome. The kingdom and subsequent Romance Province were considered a notable center of the Jewish Diaspora. Jews from Judea and Cappadocia regularly traveled to and settled in each others lands. Cappadocia was home to two notable Jewish intellectuals: Judah and Samuel of Cappadocia, while Nathan the Babylonian and Rabbi Akiva visited the region, and the Rabbis of the era made special adjustments to Jewish law for Cappadocia based on the circumstances unique to the region.

== Administration ==
Initially, the kingdom was organized in ten satrapies. Later, this became eleven. The satrapies were called by the Greek term strategiai, and each of them were headed by the strategos, basically an important noble. The eleven satrapies were; Melitene, Cataonia, Cilicia, Tyanitis, Garsauritis, Laouiansene, Sargarausene, Saraouene, Chamanene, Morimene, and Cilicia Tracheia. Cilicia Tracheia, the eleventh and last satrapy, was added later to the kingdom.

Control over the lands of the kingdom was maintained through royal estates and fortifications protected and maintained by nobility. There were two types of estates: those located and centered on the residence of the noble in question (whose power, as the Encyclopedia Iranica adds, "was foremost temporal") and the so-called temple estates. Within these so-called temple estates, the priests had both temporal power as well as a religious function. As a result of the double role the clergy played, they were the highest in power after the king himself.

== Hellenization ==
In imitation of their larger, southern and western neighbors, the Seleucids and Attalids, the Cappadocian kings Hellenized various aspects of the kingdom on purpose. Both the members of the Ariarathid as well as that of the Ariobarzanid houses would receive a Greek education, and adopted Hellenic titles, such as basileus, instead of the native shah. Although the first few Cappadocian kings, that is, of the Ariarathid family, minted Iranian-style coins with Aramaic descriptions, from king Ariarathes III and on, they shifted to using Greek-style coins and inscriptions. During the reign of Ariamnes, the first coins appeared with Greek inscriptions, with the monarch depicted on it in Persian dress. Like the Seleucids, the Cappadocian kings named newly founded cities after themselves (e.g., Ariaramneia, Ariarathei, Archelais). Furthermore, all three royal houses were "honored" by the Greek poleis. Roughly speaking, Hellenization in the kingdom started slowly from the course of the 3rd century BCE, and quickened in the 2nd. Nevertheless, until Archelaus, all the kingdom's rulers bore Iranian names.

== Capital ==
According to Strabo, the capital Mazaca was well-developed and populous city. It was surrounded by numerous villages and plantations, all protected by fortifications controlled by members of the royal family and the nobility.

== Kings of Cappadocia ==
- Ariarathes I 331–322 BC
- Ariarathes II 301–280 BC
- Ariaramnes 280–230 BC
- Ariarathes III 255–220 BC
- Ariarathes IV 220–163 BC
- Ariarathes V 163–130 BC
- Orophernes 159–157 BC
- Ariarathes VI 130–116 BC
- Ariarathes VII 116–101 BC
- Ariarathes VIII 101–96 BC
- Ariarathes IX 100–85 BC
- Ariobarzanes I 96–c.63 BC
- Ariobarzanes II c.63–51 BC
- Ariobarzanes III 51–42 BC
- Ariarathes X 42–36 BC
- Archelaus 36 BCE–17 AD

== See also ==
- Cappadocian calendar
- Cappadocian Greek

== Sources ==
- Ball, Warwick (2002). Rome in the East: The Transformation of an Empire. Routledge. pp. 436–437. ISBN 978-1134823864.
- Boyce, Mary (2001). Zoroastrians: Their Religious Beliefs and Practices. Psychology Press. ISBN 978-0415239028.
- Cooper, J. Eric; Decker, Michael (2012). Life and Society in Byzantine Cappadocia. Palgrave Macmillan. ISBN 978-0230361065.
- Raditsa, Leo (1983). "Iranians in Asia Minor". In Yarshater, Ehsan (ed.). The Cambridge History of Iran, Vol. 3 (1): The Seleucid, Parthian and Sasanian periods. Cambridge University Press. ISBN 978-1139054942.
- Stausberg, Michael; Vevaina, Yuhan Sohrab-Dinshaw; Tessmann, Anna, eds. (2015). The Wiley-Blackwell Companion to Zoroastrianism. John Wiley & Sons. pp. 445, 454, 468. ISBN 978-1118785508.
- Weiskopf, Michael (1987). "ASIA MINOR". In Yarshater, Ehsan (ed.). Encyclopædia Iranica. Vol. II/7:ʿArūż–Aśoka IV. London and New York: Routledge & Kegan Paul. pp. 757–764. ISBN 978-0-71009-107-9.
- Weiskopf, Michael (1990). "CAPPADOCIA". In Yarshater, Ehsan (ed.). Encyclopædia Iranica. Vol. IV: Bāyju–Carpets XIV. London and New York: Routledge & Kegan Paul. pp. 780–786. ISBN 978-0-71009-132-1.
- Van Dam, Raymond (2002). Kingdom of Snow: Roman rule and Greek culture in Cappadocia. University of Pennsylvania Press. ISBN 978-0812236811.
