= Laodice of Cappadocia =

Princess of Pontus and queen of Cappadocia

Berenice
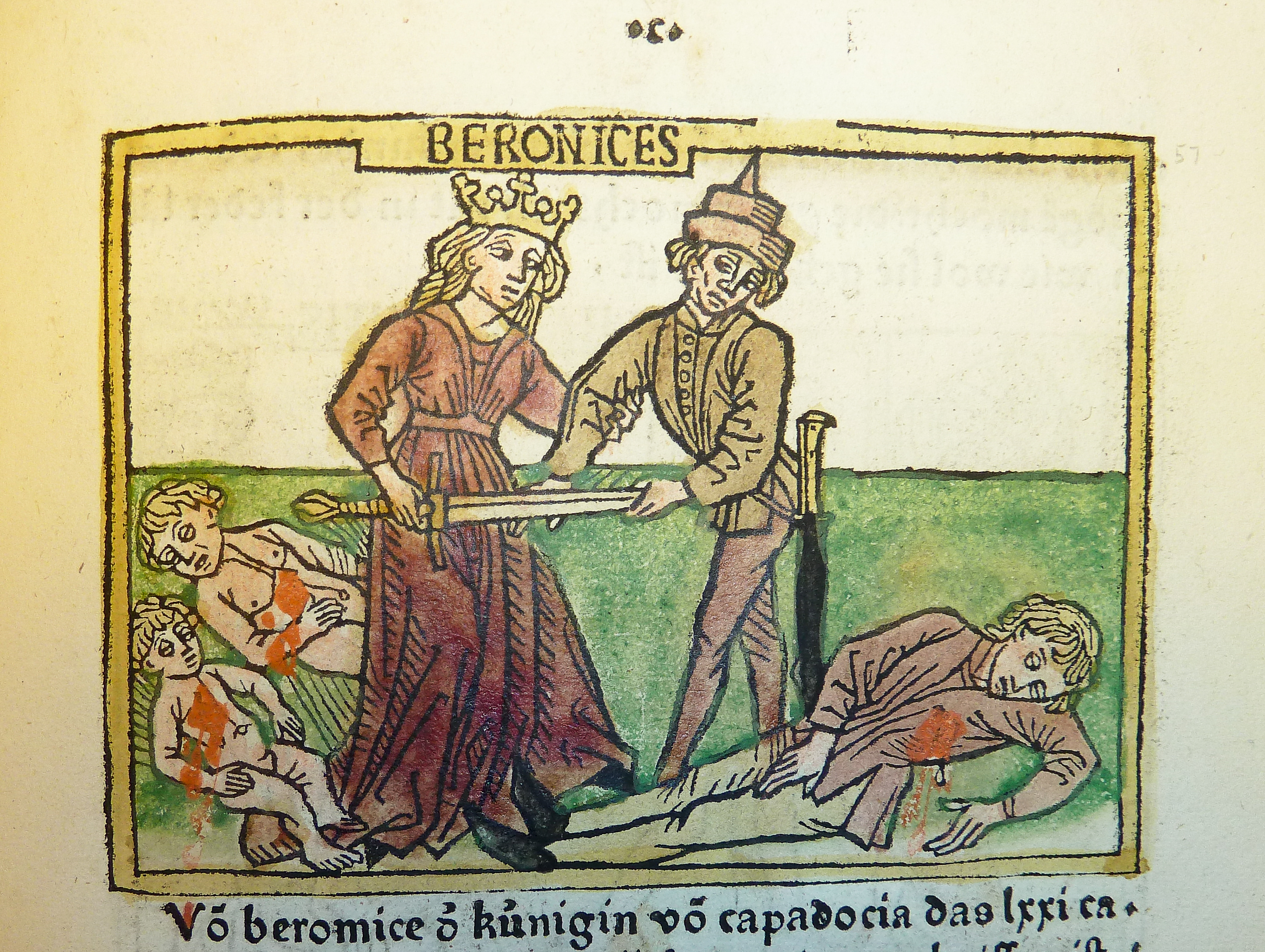
- Woodcut illustration of Berenice (or Laodice) of Cappadocia, from an incunable German translation by Heinrich Steinhöwel of Giovanni Boccaccio's De mulieribus claris, printed by Johann Zainer at Ulm c. 1474
- Born: c. 145 BC; Pontus
- Died: c. 90 BC (aged c. 55)
- Spouse: Ariarathes VI; Nicomedes III
- Issue: Ariarathes VII
- Father: Mithridates V
- Mother: Laodice VI

Berenice or Laodice of Cappadocia, also known as Laodice (Ancient Greek: Λαοδίκη Laodíkē; flourished from the mid-120s BC to the 90s BC) was a princess from the Kingdom of Pontus and a queen of the Kingdom of Cappadocia by marriage to Ariarathes VI, and queen of Bithynia by marriage to Nicomedes III. She was regent of Cappadocia in 116 BC during the minority of her son Ariarathes VII.

== Early life ==
Laodice was of Persian and Greek Macedonian ancestry. She was the first born child of the monarchs of the Kingdom of Pontus, Laodice VI and Mithridates V. One of the siblings was Mithridates, who became Mithridates VI, and reigned 120–63 BC. She was born and raised in Pontus.

Between 130 and 126 BC, her aunt, the sister of Mithridates V, queen of Cappadocia and regent of her son Ariarathes VI, Nysa of Cappadocia, died. She had been the wife and later the widow of the previous Cappadocian King Ariarathes V.

Mithridates V was aware of the turbulent political situation in Cappadocia, which ended in the death of his sister, Nysa. In the mid 120s BC, he became interested in Cappadocia and wanted to expand Pontian foreign policy in that country. He decided to invade Cappadocia.

== Queen consort ==
To fend off any Pontian invasion, Ariarathes VI arranged with Mithridates V to marry Laodice, his paternal cousin. There is a possibility that the invasion of Mithridates V was in fact friendly on behalf of Ariarathes VI to settle internal Cappadocian strife and help him to establish himself as a ruler. The marriage between Ariarathes VI and Laodice marked a cessation of hostilities between Cappadocia and Pontus. Through this arranged marriage, Mithridates V was able to keep a close check on Ariarathes VI and control Cappadocia indirectly. Laodice presumably could act in her father's interests. As queen she wielded considerable power. She bore Ariarathes VI three children: Nysa, who married King Nicomedes III and two sons, both called Ariarathes, who became Ariarathes VII Philometor and Ariarathes VIII Epiphanes.

Mithridates V died in 120 BC and Laodice's first brother, Mithridates VI, succeeded their father as King of Pontus. Ten years later Laodice may have found it much harder to exert control over Ariarathes VI. There could be a possibility that Pontian political influence in Cappadocian affairs may have declined as Ariarathes VI became independent minded and began to assert himself.

Mithridates VI continued the Pontian foreign policy in Cappadocia where his father had left off. He plotted with Gordius, a Greek nobleman who was a member of the court of Ariarathes VI and a good friend of Mithridates VI, to assassinate Ariarathes VI between 116 BC-111 BC. Laodice was probably not involved in this murder.

== Regency ==
After the death of Ariarathes VI, Laodice became the queen regent of her first son, the young Ariarathes VII. Laodice's former son-in-law and a widower, King Nicomedes III Euergetes, wanted to take advantage of the political situation in Cappadocia. Without informing anyone, he suddenly invaded Cappadocia as Ariarathes VII was underage.

Laodice decided to support Nicomedes III. To preserve Cappadocia, her sovereignty and the succession of her son, she married him. She would also have better opportunities with him. Through this second marriage, she also became Queen of Bithynia. When Mithridates VI heard about the Cappadocian invasion, he hurried there with his army to help his sister, but, given Laodice's marriage, instead helped Ariarathes VII.

== Later life ==
Mithridates drove Nicomedes III out of Cappadocia and established himself as the patron of Ariarathes VII. He then pretended that he wanted to recall Gordius from exile hoping that Ariarathes VII would oppose this, thus giving him a pretext for war. Ariarathes VII did oppose this and mobilised an army which matched Mithridates’. Given the size of the force of Ariarathes VII, Mithridates called a conference and used this meeting to murder him in 101 BC or 100 BC. He then installed one of his sons as Ariarathes IX of Cappadocia under the regency of Gordius.

The Cappadocians revolted and called for Ariarathes’ brother, Ariarathes VIII, to return to Cappadocia to become king in 100 BC. Mithridates invaded Cappadocia and drove him out. Ariarathes VIII died in 96 BC. With his death, his dynasty died out. Nicomedes pretended that Laodice had a third son from him and sent a young man to Rome to apply for the throne of Bithynia from the Roman Senate. He also sent Laodice to Rome to testify that he was Nicomedes' son. At this point, Laodice no longer features in Justin's text, which is our only ancient source regarding her. Mithridates sent Gordius to Rome to testify that Ariarathes IX, whom he had installed as king, was a descendant of Ariarathes V, who died in 130 BC when he supported Rome in a war against Eumenes III of Pergamon. The Senate saw the scheming by both sides and did not assign the Cappadocia to either contender.

The text of a decree issued in 95 or 94 BC by the city of Delphi had survived. It concerned the assignment of tasks for thirty slaves which king Nicomedes and queen Laodice provided when the city sent delegates to them to ask them for slaves. The decree also made arrangements for honouring Nicomedes and Laodice. It provided for the erection of a statue of the king and one of queen in the most prominent place in the temple of Pythian Apollo and for the grant to the two monarchs and their descendants of proxeny, priority of access to the oracle of Delphi and in receiving justice, tax exemption, privileged seating at the city's games and other privileges that were given to other proxenoi and other benefactors of the city.

Regarding the outcome of the two embassies sent to Rome, the Roman Senate ordered Mithridates to leave Cappadocia and Nicomedes to leave Paphlagonia. In order not to offend the two kings by giving what was taken from them to other kings, it also ordered that the peoples of both states were to have an elective republic. However, the Cappadocians wanted to retain a kingdom. Therefore, the Senate appointed Ariobarzanes I as their king.

== Literature ==
She is remembered in De Mulieribus Claris, a collection of biographies of historical and mythological women by the Florentine author Giovanni Boccaccio, composed in 1361–62. It is notable as the first collection devoted exclusively to biographies of women in Western literature.
