= Ariarathes I of Cappadocia =

4th-century BC king of Cappadocia

Ariarathes
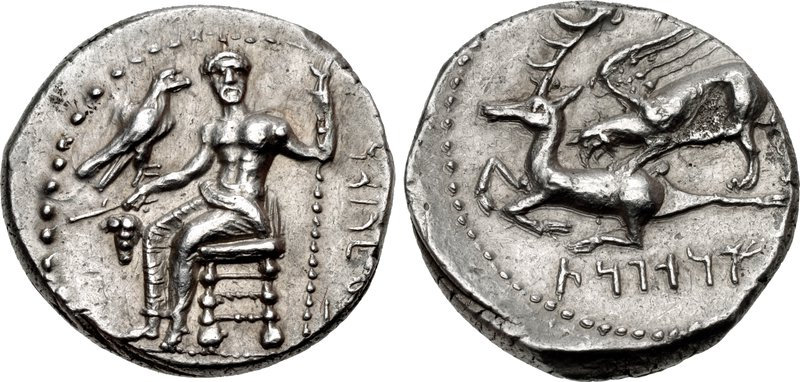
- Coin of Ariarathes I, minted in Gaziura, dated 333–322 BC

Satrap of Northern Cappadocia
- In office 340s BC – 331 BC
- Preceded by: Ariamnes I
- Succeeded by: Himself (as King of Cappadocia)

King of Cappadocia
- In office 331 BC – 322 BC
- Preceded by: Himself (as Satrap of Northern Cappadocia)
- Succeeded by: Vacant (title next held by Ariarathes II

Personal details
- Born: 405/4 BC
- Died: 322 BC
- Relatives: Ariamnes I (father); Orophernes/Holophernes (brother)
- Dynasty: Ariarathid

Military service
- Allegiance: Achaemenid Empire (until 331 BC); Kingdom of Cappadocia (until 322 BC)
- Battles/wars: Battle of Gaugamela

Ariarathes I (Old Iranian: Aryaraθa, Aramaic: Ariorath or Ariourat; Ancient Greek: Ἀριαράθης, romanized: Ariaráthēs; 405/4 BC – 322 BC) was the last Achaemenid Persian governor (satrap) of the province (satrapy) of Northern Cappadocia, serving from the 340s BC to 331 BC. He led defensive efforts against the Macedonian invasion, commanded by Alexander the Great, and later fought at the Battle of Gaugamela under Darius III, the last King of Kings of the Achaemenid Empire. After the fall of the Achaemenid Empire, Ariarathes continued his resistance against the Macedonians, ruling concomitantly as an Achaemenid remnant and a precursor to the Kingdom of Cappadocia. He is regarded as the founder of the Iranian Ariarathid dynasty.

Ariarathes was eventually captured and executed in 322 BC by the Macedonian Perdiccas. His territory was seized, whereafter it was contested between several of Alexander's successors and former generals. However, Ariarathes's dynastic successors regained control over Cappadocia in 301 BC and ruled over the kingdom until 96 BC when they were deposed by the Roman Republic.

== Name ==
"Ariarathes" is the Hellenized form of an Old Iranian name, perhaps *Arya-wratha ("having Aryan joy"). The name is attested in Aramaic as Ariorath or Ariourat, and in later Latin sources as Ariaratus.

== Biography ==
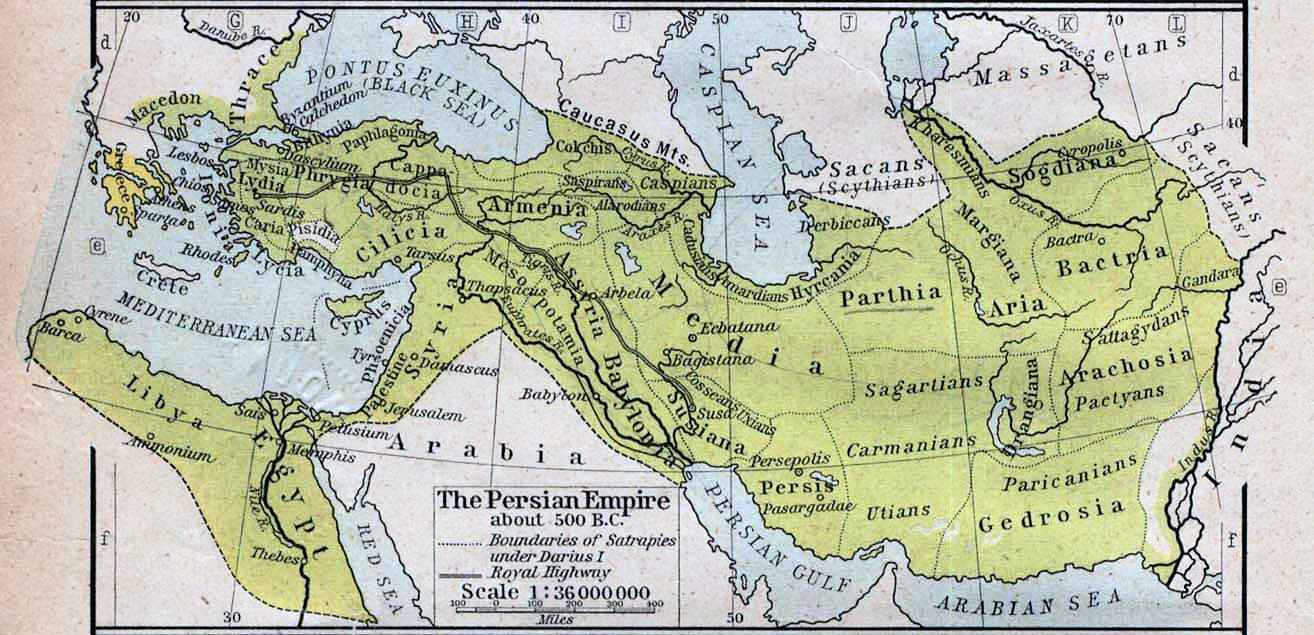
Map depicting the Achaemenid Empire in c. 500 BC, by William Robert Shepherd (1923)

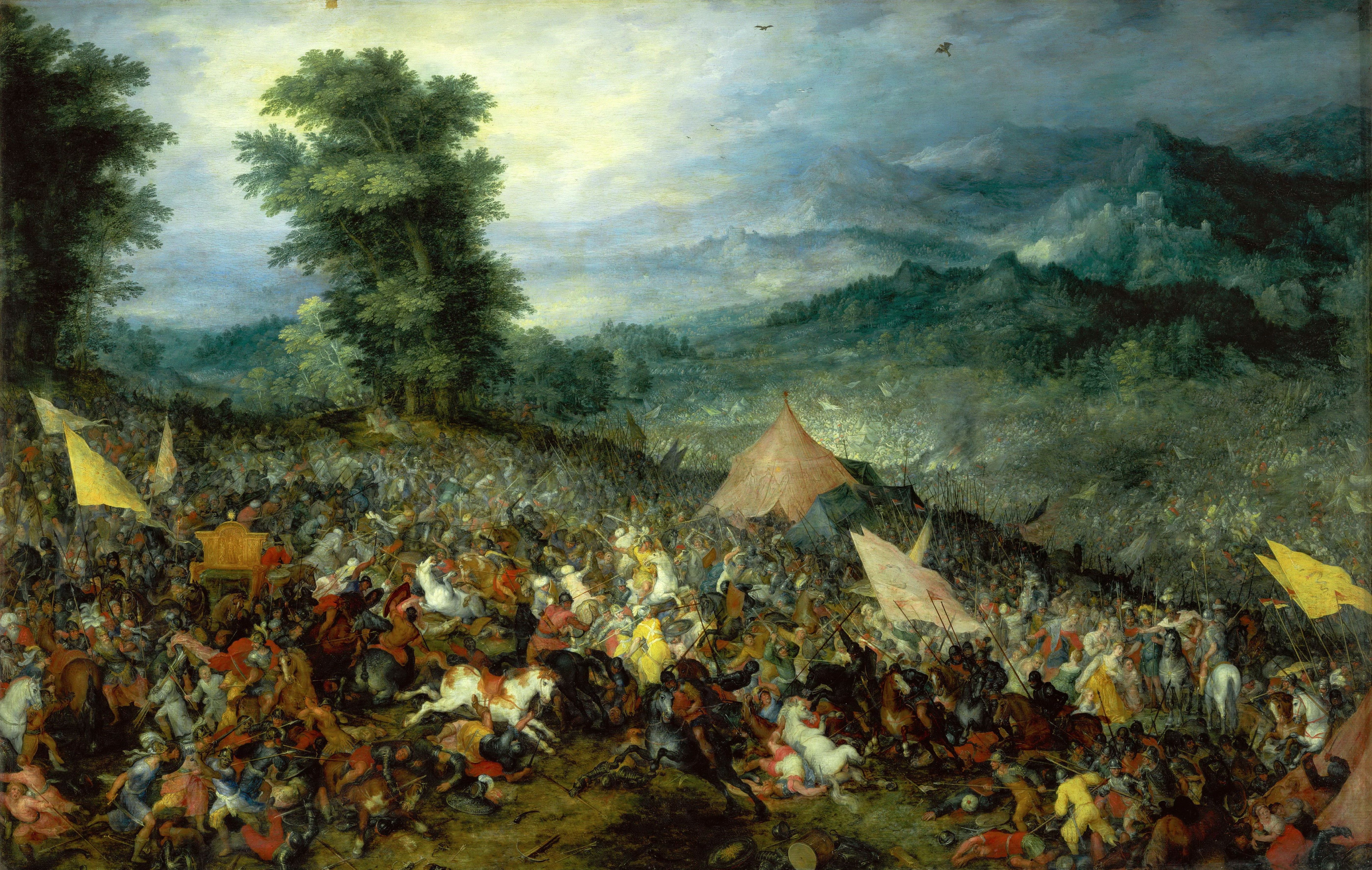
Anachronistic painting of the Battle of Gaugamela by Jan Brueghel the Elder (1602)

Although details of Ariarathes I's life are scant, it is known that he was born in 405/4 BC to Ariamnes and had a brother named Orophernes (Holophernes). He founded the eponymous Ariarathid dynasty, an Iranian family that claimed descent from Cyrus the Great, the first King of the Persian Achaemenid Empire, and Anaphas, one of the seven Persian conspirators who killed the Pseudo-Smerdis. During the reign of Artaxerxes II (r. 404–358 BC), King of Kings of the Persian Achaemenid Empire, Ariarathes and his family served as minor officials in the satrapy of Cappadocia, which was governed by Datames at the time. Sometime after the assassination of Datames in c. 362 BC, possibly after the ascension of Artaxerxes III (r. 358–338 BC), Cappadocia was divided into a northern and southern satrapy. (Note: These northern and southern parts were also respectively known as Pontic Cappadocia and Greater, or Tauric Cappadocia.) This change was implemented in response to the excessive power that Datames had amassed during his governorship as well as to improve the efficacy of the administration. By the 340s BC, Ariarathes had become satrap in Northern Cappadocia, having succeeded his father Ariamnes, overseeing territory that would later become the Kingdom of Pontus. The stability of Ariarathes's territory enabled him to send provincial troops with Artaxerxes III on the Achaemenid campaign to pacify Egypt.

During the reign of King Darius III (r. 336–330 BC), Macedonian forces led by Alexander the Great (r. 336–323 BC) invaded Persian territory. Cappadocia and the neighbouring satrapy of Phrygia became rallying points for the Achaemenid resistance. Defensive efforts were hampered by losses such as the death of Mithrobuzanes, governor of the southern Cappadocian satrapy, who was killed at the Battle of Granicus in 334 BC. However, the Macedonian-appointed replacement, Abistamenes, failed to establish his authority over this newly conquered territory and he later vanished into obscurity. Cappadocia continued to be an important focal point of Achaemenid resistance and was also used as a staging area for a campaign to retake western Anatolia. Fortunately for Ariarathes, his territory was largely unaffected by the invasion and he was able to establish himself as a key figure leading the resistance, and subsequently commanded troops at the Battle of Gaugamela in 331 BC. After the Persian defeat at Gaugamela, the end of the Achaemenid Empire and its replacement by Alexander's Macedonian Empire, Ariarathes continued to resist the Macedonians from his base at Gaziura (Gazioura) as an independent monarch until his death.

In 323 BC, following the death of Alexander, Cappadocia was granted to Eumenes, but he was unable to dislodge Ariarathes and consolidate his hold, as Cappadocia had not been properly subjugated by Alexander. This situation was exacerbated by Eumenes' failure to obtain support from the other Macedonian satraps. He then turned to Perdiccas, regent of the incumbent Macedonian ruler Philip III Arrhidaeus (r. 323–317 BC), who, needing to bring more loyal governors to his side, agreed to assist Eumenes in capturing Ariarathes's domain. In the summer of 322 BC, Perdiccas, the royal court, and the battle-hardened royal Macedonian army entered Cappadocia. Ariarathes, who was reputed to be quite wealthy, apparently managed to muster a force composed of locals and mercenaries to face Perdiccas, but was defeated and captured. He and most of his family members were crucified that same year.

== Coinage ==
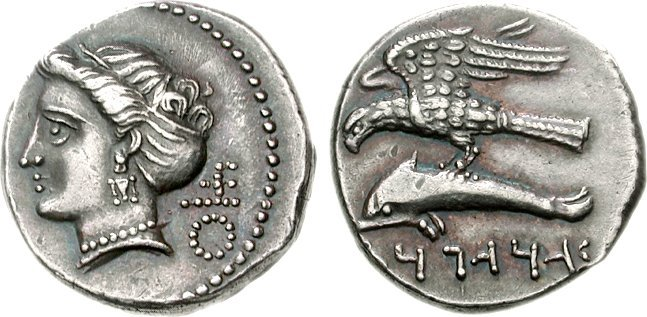
Coin of Ariarathes I, minted in Sinope, dated 333–322 BC

Ariarathes I minted campaign coinage at Sinope and Gaziura inscribed with legends in Aramaic, the imperial language of the Achaemenids. On the reverse of one of Ariarathes's Gaziura coins, a griffin is depicted attacking a kneeling stag with Ariarathes's name is inscribed as 'rywrt. The obverse of the same coin depicts a Zeus-like impression of the God Baal with wreath and sceptre in his left hand. In his right hand, on which an eagle is perched, the seated figure holds ears of corn and a vine-branch with grapes. The obverse features the inscription b'lgzyr ("Ba'al Gazir", i.e. "Lord of Gaziura"). Stylistically, this particular issue of coinage by Ariarathes resembles the coins issued by Achaemenid satrap Mazaeus at Tarsos in Cilicia. The Iranologist Mary Boyce and the historian Frantz Grenet note that the Zeus-like depiction of a seated Baal could actually be portraying the Zoroastrian Ahura Mazda or Mithra.

Coins of Ariarathes minted at Sinope stylistically resemble Greek issues from the same city, but feature Ariarathes's name in Aramaic. On the obverse of the Sinope issues, the head of the local nymph Sinope is depicted wearing a sphendone (σφενδόνη - headband) within a border of dots. On the reverse, an eagle with wings aloft a dolphin is depicted, under which is inscribed Ariarathes's name.

== Successors ==
A few years after the death of Ariarathes I, Antigonus I Monophthalmus, a former general of Alexander, executed Eumenes and seized control of Cappadocia. Control of the region then passed to Lysimachus (r. 306–281 BC), King of Thrace, Asia Minor and Macedon, but Lysimachus was captured thereafter by Seleucus I Nicator (r. 305–281), Basileus of the Seleucid Empire, who, like Eumenes, Perdiccas, Antigonus and Lysimachus, was one of the Diadochi ("successors") of Alexander. Southern Cappadocia, deemed more strategically important to the Seleucids than its northern counterpart, spent a brief period under Seleucid control. Then, in about 301 BC, around the time of the Battle of Ipsus, Ariarathes I's nephew Ariarathes II managed to restore Ariarathid control over Southern Cappadocia with Armenian military assistance. Ariarathes II subsequently ruled Southern Cappadocia under Seleucid suzerainty.

After the deaths of Lysimachus and Seleucus, Northern Cappadocia, once held by Ariarathes I, was incorporated into the Kingdom of Pontus, founded by Mithridates I. Around the same time (c. 280 BC), in Southern Cappadocia, Ariarathes II was succeeded by his son Ariaramnes. In c. 255 BC, Ariaramnes, or his son and successor Ariarathes III of Cappadocia, declared independence from the Seleucids. Ariarathes I's successors ruled the Kingdom of Cappadocia until 96 BC when they were replaced by the Ariobarzanids due to Roman intervention.

== Sources ==
- Boyce, Mary; Grenet, Frantz (1991). Beck, Roger (ed.). A History of Zoroastrianism, Zoroastrianism under Macedonian and Roman Rule. Leiden: Brill. ISBN 978-9004293915.
- Brunner, C. J. (1986). "Ariaratus". In Yarshater, Ehsan (ed.). Encyclopædia Iranica. Vol. II/4: Architecture IV–Armenia and Iran IV. London and New York: Routledge & Kegan Paul. p. 406. ISBN 978-0-71009-104-8.
- Dusinberre, Elspeth R. M. (2013). Empire, Authority, and Autonomy in Achaemenid Anatolia. Cambridge: Cambridge University Press. ISBN 978-1107577152.
- Erciyas, Deniz Burcu (2006). Wealth, Aristocracy And Royal Propaganda Under the Hellenistic Kingdom of the Mithradatids in the Central Black Sea Region of Turkey. Leiden: Brill. ISBN 978-9004146099.
- Hazel, John (2001). Who's Who in the Greek World (1 ed.). Routledge. ISBN 978-0415260329.
- McGing, Brian (2012). "Ariarathes". In Hornblower, Simon; Spawforth, Antony; Eidinow, Esther (eds.). The Oxford Classical Dictionary (4 ed.). Oxford: Oxford University Press. ISBN 978-0199545568.
- Mørkholm, Otto (1991). Westermark, Ulla; Grierson, Philip (eds.). Early Hellenistic Coinage from the Accession of Alexander to the Peace of Apamaea (336-188 B.C.). Oxford: Oxford University Press. ISBN 978-0521395045.
- Raditsa, Leo (1983). "Iranians in Asia Minor". In Yarshater, Ehsan (ed.). The Cambridge History of Iran, Vol. 3 (1): The Seleucid, Parthian and Sasanian periods. Cambridge: Cambridge University Press. ISBN 978-1139054942.
- Roisman, Joseph (2012). Alexander's Veterans and the Early Wars of the Successors. Austin: University of Texas Press. ISBN 978-0292742888.
- Schmitt, Rüdiger (1994). "Datames". In Yarshater, Ehsan (ed.). Encyclopædia Iranica. Vol. VII/2: Dastūr al-Afāżel–Dehqān I. London and New York: Routledge & Kegan Paul. pp. 115–117. ISBN 978-1-56859-020-2.
- Schottky, Martin (2006). "Ariarathes". In Salazar, Christine F.; Landfester, Manfred; Gentry, Francis G. (eds.). Brill's New Pauly. Brill Online.
- Shahbazi, A. Sh. (1986). "Ariyāramna". In Yarshater, Ehsan (ed.). Encyclopædia Iranica. Vol. II/4: Architecture IV–Armenia and Iran IV. London and New York: Routledge & Kegan Paul. pp. 410–411. ISBN 978-0-71009-104-8.
- Sherwin-White, Susan M. (1984). "Asia Minor". In Ling, Roger (ed.). The Cambridge Ancient History: Plates to Volumes VII, part 1. Cambridge: Cambridge University Press. ISBN 978-0521243544.
- Weiskopf, Michael (1987). "Asia Minor". In Yarshater, Ehsan (ed.). Encyclopædia Iranica. Vol. II/7:ʿArūż–Aśoka IV. London and New York: Routledge & Kegan Paul. pp. 757–764. ISBN 978-0-71009-107-9.
- Weiskopf, Michael (1990). "Cappadocia". In Yarshater, Ehsan (ed.). Encyclopædia Iranica. Vol. IV: Bāyju–Carpets XIV. London and New York: Routledge & Kegan Paul. pp. 780–786. ISBN 978-0-71009-132-1.
- Yardley, J. C. (2011). Wheatley, Pat; Heckel, Waldemar (eds.). Justin: Epitome of The Philippic History of Pompeius Trogus: Volume II: Books 13-15: The Successors to Alexander the Great. Oxford: Oxford University Press. ISBN 978-0199277599.
- Yavuz, Mehmet Fatih (2010). "Cappadocia". In Gagarin, Michael (ed.). The Oxford Encyclopedia of Ancient Greece and Rome. Oxford: Oxford University Press. ISBN 978-0195170726.

Political offices
Preceded by Ariamnes I	Satrap of Cappadocia; 340s – 331 BC	Succeeded by Himself as King of Cappadocia
Regnal titles
Preceded by Himself as Satrap of Cappadocia	King of Cappadocia; 331 – 322 BC	Vacant Title next held by Ariarathes II
