= Nysa (wife of Nicomedes III of Bithynia) =

Nysa or Nyssa (Greek: Νύσ(σ)α, flourished second half of 2nd century BC) was a princess from the kingdom of Cappadocia in Anatolia.

Nysa was of royal Greek Macedonian and Persian ancestry. She was the daughter and first-born child of the monarchs Ariarathes VI of Cappadocia and Laodice of Cappadocia. Her parents were cousins and her younger brothers were the Kings Ariarathes VII of Cappadocia and Ariarathes VIII of Cappadocia. She was the namesake of her paternal grandmother Nysa of Cappadocia a previous Queen, wife of the previous King Ariarathes V of Cappadocia and mother of Ariarathes VI. She was born and raised in Cappadocia.

At an unknown date, Nysa became the first wife of Greek King Nicomedes III of Bithynia, who reigned between from c. 127 BC to c. 94 BC. Nysa and Nicomedes III were distantly related as they shared lineage from the Seleucid dynasty, the Antipatrid dynasty and the Antigonid dynasty. Through marriage, she became Queen of Bithynia.

Nysa bore Nicomedes III a daughter also named Nysa. Not much is known about her life after her daughter's birth. Nicomedes III married her mother after some time, possibly because Nysa died.
