= Anaphas =

Anaphas (Greek: Ἀναφᾶς) was a Persian noble said to have been one of the seven Persians who slew the usurper Bardiya in 522 BCE, and to have been lineally descended from Atossa, the sister of Cambyses, who was the father of Cyrus the Great. The kings of Cappadocia traced their origin to Anaphas, who received the government of Cappadocia, free from taxes. Anaphas was succeeded by his son of the same name, and the latter by Datames.
