= Ariamnes =

4th-century BC satrap of Cappadocia

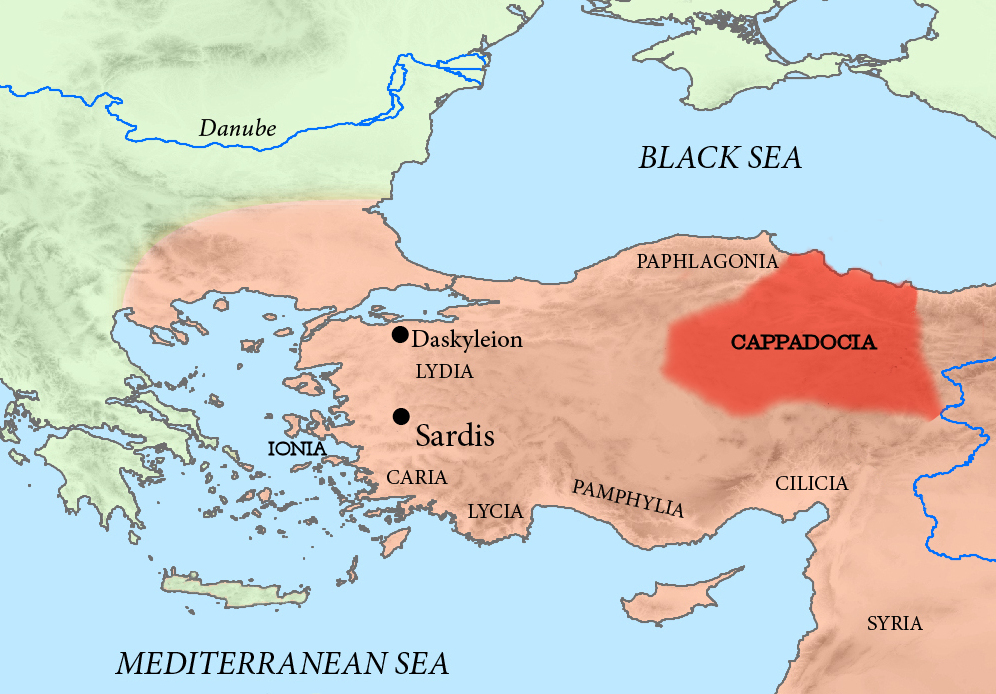
Ariamnes was satrap of Achaemenid Cappadocia.

Ariamnes I (Ancient Greek: Ἀριάμνης Ariámnēs; fl. 4th century BC; ruled 362–350 BC) was satrap of Cappadocia under Persian suzerainty. Son of Datames and father of Ariarathes I and his brother Orophernes (Holophernes), Diodorus states that Ariamnes governed fifty years although it is unclear how this could be correct given the dates that his father Datames (ruled 385-362 BC) and his son Ariarathes I (ruled 350-331 BC) were satraps of Cappadocia.

== Notes ==
Preceded by Datames	Satrap of Cappadocia	Succeeded by Ariarathes I
