= Nysa of Cappadocia =

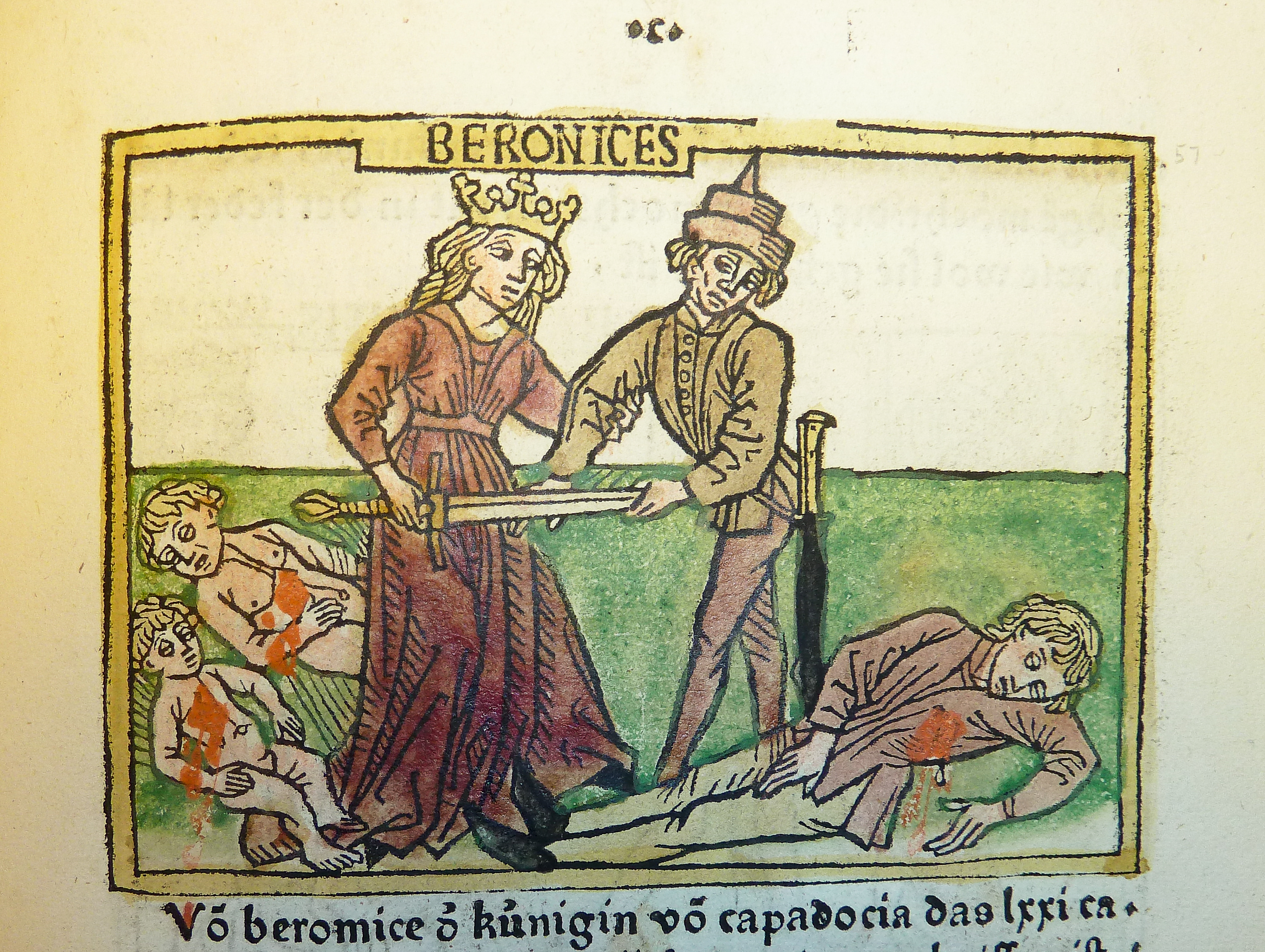

Nysa or Nyssa (Greek: Νύσ(σ)α, fl. 150s – 126 BC) was a princess from the Kingdom of Pontus and was a Queen of Cappadocia. She was the ruler of Cappadocia on behalf of her minor son in 130 – 126 BC.

== Biography ==
Nysa was of Greek Macedonian and Persian ancestry. She was the daughter of Pharnaces I and queen Nysa. Her brother was Mithridates who became Mithridates V. She is also known as Laodice. Nysa was the namesake of her mother, who is believed to have died during childbirth, while giving birth to either her or Mithridates. She was born and raised in the Kingdom of Pontus.

Sometime after 160 BC, Nysa married King Ariarathes V. They were distant relatives as they had lineage from the Seleucid dynasty and from the Pontian monarchs. Through this marriage, Nysa became Queen of Cappadocia.

Ariarathes V and Nysa were attracted to the culture of Athens. Nysa had either given the Athenians a gift or done a favor for them. They were honored as patrons by the Artists of Dionysus at Athens. The guild voted a decree in their honor. It placed a statue of Ariarathes V, in their shrine and celebrated the birthdays of Nysa and Ariarathes V in recognition of the gifts the artists had received from them.

Ariarathes V died in 130 BC and his youngest son with Nysa, Ariarathes VI, succeeded him. During their marriage, Nysa bore Ariarathes V five other sons. At some point, Nysa poisoned her five other children so she might obtain the government of the Kingdom. Ariarathes VI was still too young to rule, so Nysa acted as his regent between 130 - 126 BC.

The citizens of Cappadocia - who were loyal to the ruling dynasty - had Nysa put to death on account of her cruelty and allowed Ariarathes VI to continue to reign as king. Nysa’s regency reflected a period of turbulence in the royal family which ended with her death. Her reign was the beginning of the end of this ruling dynasty of Cappadocia. Her grandchildren Ariarathes VII and Ariarathes VIII were the last kings of this dynasty .

Coinage from the Nysa regency has survived. One coin shows the portraits busts of Nysa and Ariarathes VI. On the other side there is the inscription ΒΑΣΙΛΙΣΣΗΣ ΝΗΣΗΣ ΚΑΙ ΒΑΣΙΛΕΩΣ ΑΡΙΑΡΑΘΟΥ ΕΠΙΦΑΝΟΥΣ ΤΟΥ ΓΙΟΥ, which means of Queen Nysa and King Ariarathes Epiphanes imminent son. There is a depiction of Athena standing and holding Nike by the inscription.

== Sources ==
- Cartledge, P. Garnsey, P., E.S. Gruen, E.S., Hellenistic constructs: essays in culture, history and historiography (Hellenistic Culture and Society), University of California Press, 1997; ISBN 978-0-520-20676-2
- Day, j., An economic history of Athens under Roman domination, Literary Licensing, LLC, 2011; ISBN 978-1-258-13104-3
- McGing, B.C., The foreign policy of Mithridates VI Eupator, King of Pontus, BRILL, 1986; ASIN: B01FGJZISI
- Smith, Dictionary of Greek and Roman Biography and Mythology, v. 2, page 1216-97 "Dictionary of Greek and Roman Biography and Mythology, page 284 (V. 1)". Archived from the original on 2011-06-04.
- http://www.snible.org/coins/hn/cappadocia.html#Ariarathes VI
- http://www.guide2womenleaders.com/womeninpower/European-Queen-Regnants.htm
