= Nicomedes III of Bithynia =

King of Bithynia (127–94 BC)

Nicomedes III Benefactor
- Basileus of Bithynia
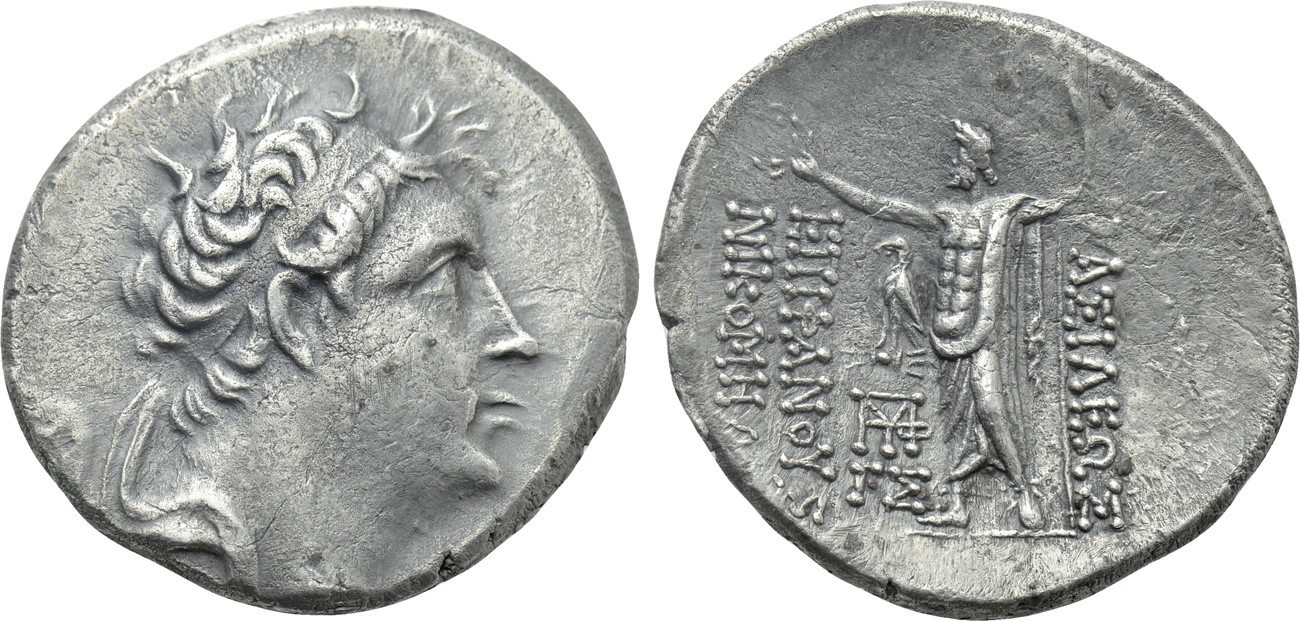
- Tetradrachm of Nikomedes III

Kings of Bithynia
- Reign: c. 127 BC - 94 BC
- Predecessor: Nicomedes II
- Successor: Nicomedes IV
- Spouse: Aristonica (wife); Nysa (wife); Laodice of Cappadocia (wife); Hagne (concubine)
- Issue: Nicomedes IV; Socrates Chrestus; Nysa; Pylaemenes III (possibly)
- Father: Nicomedes II

Nicomedes III Euergetes ("the Benefactor", Ancient Greek: Νικομήδης Εὐεργέτης) was the king of Bithynia, from c. 127 BC to c. 94 BC. He was the son and successor of Nicomedes II of Bithynia.

== Life ==
Memnon of Heraclea wrote that Nicomedes IV was the son of Nicomedes III with his wife Nysa but according to Granius Licinianus, Nicomedes IV was his son by an earlier wife called Aristonica who died nine days after her son's birth. He then married Nysa, the daughter of Ariarathes VI of Cappadocia and, Laodice of Cappadocia, the sister of Mithridates V of Pontus. Both Nicomedes III and Nysa shared a lineage from the Seleucid dynasty of the Seleucid Empire. He and Nysa likely had a daughter also named Nysa. Nicomedes also had another son, Socrates Chrestus, from a concubine called Hagne who was from Cyzicus. He sent Socrates and Hagne to Cyzicus with 500 talents. His third wife was Laodice of Cappadocia, his former mother-in-law.

Nicomedes and Mithridates VI of Pontus made an alliance. The latter invaded Paphlagonia and drove its ruler, who descended from Pylaemenes, out. The two kings partitioned it among themselves.

Mithridates VI had Ariarathes VI of Cappadocia (the husband of Laodice and father of Nysa) murdered by a certain Gordius in 116 BC. Afterwards he decided to remove (i.e. murder) the young sons of Ariarathes VI and Laodice as he thought that his gains from the murder, the control of Cappadocia, might be lost if they would turn against him. However, Nicomedes invaded Cappadocia "while it was left defenceless by the death of its sovereign." Mithridates VI sent assistance to his sister “on pretence of affection for her, to enable her to drive Nicomedes out of Cappadocia.” However, Laodice made an agreement to marry Nicomedes . An angry Mithridates drove Nicomedes out and restored Ariarathes VII, the son of Laodice. After this he murdered Ariarathes VII of Cappadocia and installed his son on the Cappadocian throne as Ariarathes IX under the guardianship of Gordius.

In 100 BC, after the murder of Ariarathes VII the Cappadocians revolted against Mithridates VI and called his for brother, Ariarathes VIII of Cappadocia, who was in Pergamon for his education, to return to Cappadocia to become king. Mithridates invaded Cappadocia and drove him out. Ariarathes VIII died in 96 BC. With his death, his dynasty died out. Nicomedes III now feared that Mithridates would invade Bithynia. He pretended that Laodice had a third son from him and instructed a young man to apply for the throne of Bithynia (or, more likely, the Cappadocian throne, see note) from the Roman senate. (Note: It is unclear why Nicomedes III should pretend to have had this son with Laodice and get him to apply for the Bithynian throne. Nicomedes has an heir for the Bithynian throne. Moreover, Bithynia was an independent kingdom. Thus, there was no need for applying for its throne from the Romans. It is more likely that this was about the Cappadocian throne. Claiming that Nicomedes ad Laodice had a son together would mean that there was a legitimate heir to the Cappadocian throne, while Ariarathes IX was a usurper. The fact that Cappadocia was an ally of Rome meant that she could rule in favour of Nicomedes' claim and against Ariarathes IX. This would also explain why Mithridates sent Gordius to Rome to support his son. This confusion might be due to an error in the transcription from the original manuscript.) He sent Laodice to Rome to testify that he was Nicomedes' son. When Mithridates heard about this, he sent Gordius to Rome to legitimise his enthronement of Ariarathes IX in Cappadocia by claiming this man was a descendant of Ariarathes V of Cappadocia, who had been an ally of Rome and who died in 130 BC when he supported Rome in a war against Eumenes III of Pergamon. The senate saw the scheming by both kings. It ordered Mithridates to leave Cappadocia and, "to console him", also ordered Nicomedes III to leave Paphlagonia.

The text of a decree issued in 102 B.C by the city of Delphi has survived. It concerned the assignment of tasks for thirty slaves which king Nicomedes and queen Laodice provided when the city sent delegates to them to ask them for slaves. The decree also made arrangements for honouring Nicomedes and Laodice. It provided for the erection of a statue of the king and one of queen in the most prominent place in the temple of Pythian Apollo and for the grant to the two monarchs and their descendants of proxeny, priority of access to the oracle of Delphi and in receiving justice, tax exemption, privileged seating at the city's games and other privileges that were given to other proxenoi and benefactors of the city who were given same rights as its citizens, except for public office, and free trade in the city.

Diodorus Siculus wrote that when Nicomedes III was asked to provide troops for the consul Gaius Marius during the Cimbrian War with the Cimbri and Teutones in Gallia Transalpina in 104 BC, he turned down the request, saying in his reply that "most of the Bithynians had been taken away as slaves by the tax-collectors, and were dispersed throughout the provinces." The Roman Senate acted on this information and decreed that "no freeman belonging to any of the Roman allies should in any province be forced to be a slave, and that the praetors should take care to see that they were all set free."

== Sources ==
Primary sources

- Diodorus Siculus, Library of History, v. 12, books 33-40 (Loeb Classical Library), Loeb, 1989; ISBN 978-0674994652
- Granius Licinianus, Grani Liciniani Quae Supersunt (Classic Reprint), Forgotten Books, 2018; ISBN 978-0428904401
- Festus, Eutropius: Festus, Eutropii, Sext. Aurelii Victoris, Nec Non Sexti Rufi Historiae Romanae Breviarium: Ad Codices Manuscriptos & Optimas Editiones Recognitum & Correctum, Ulan Press, 2012; ASIN: B009FV0XXY
- Justin, Epitome of the Philippic History of Pompeius Trogus (Classical Resources Series, No 3), Society for Classical Studies Classical Resources, Oxford University Press, U.S.A., 1994; ISBN 978-1555409517

Secondary sources

- Gabelko, O. L., The Dynastic History of the Hellenistic Monarchies of Asia Minor According to Chronography of George Synkellos. O. L. Gabelko, pp. 9–10
- McGing, B.C., The foreign policy of Mithridates VI Eupator, King of Pontus, BRILL, 1986

Preceded by Nicomedes II	King of Bithynia; 127 BC – 94 BC	Succeeded by Nicomedes IV
