= Ariobarzanes II of Cappadocia =

King of Cappadocia

Ariobarzanes II

King of Cappadoccia
- Reign: 63 BC–62 BC to 51 BC
- Predecessor: Ariobarzanes I of Cappadocia
- Successor: Ariobarzanes III of Cappadocia
- Spouse: Athenais Philostorgos II
- Issue: Ariobarzanes III of Cappadocia; Ariarathes X of Cappadocia
- Father: Ariobarzanes I of Cappadocia
- Mother: Athenais Philostorgos I

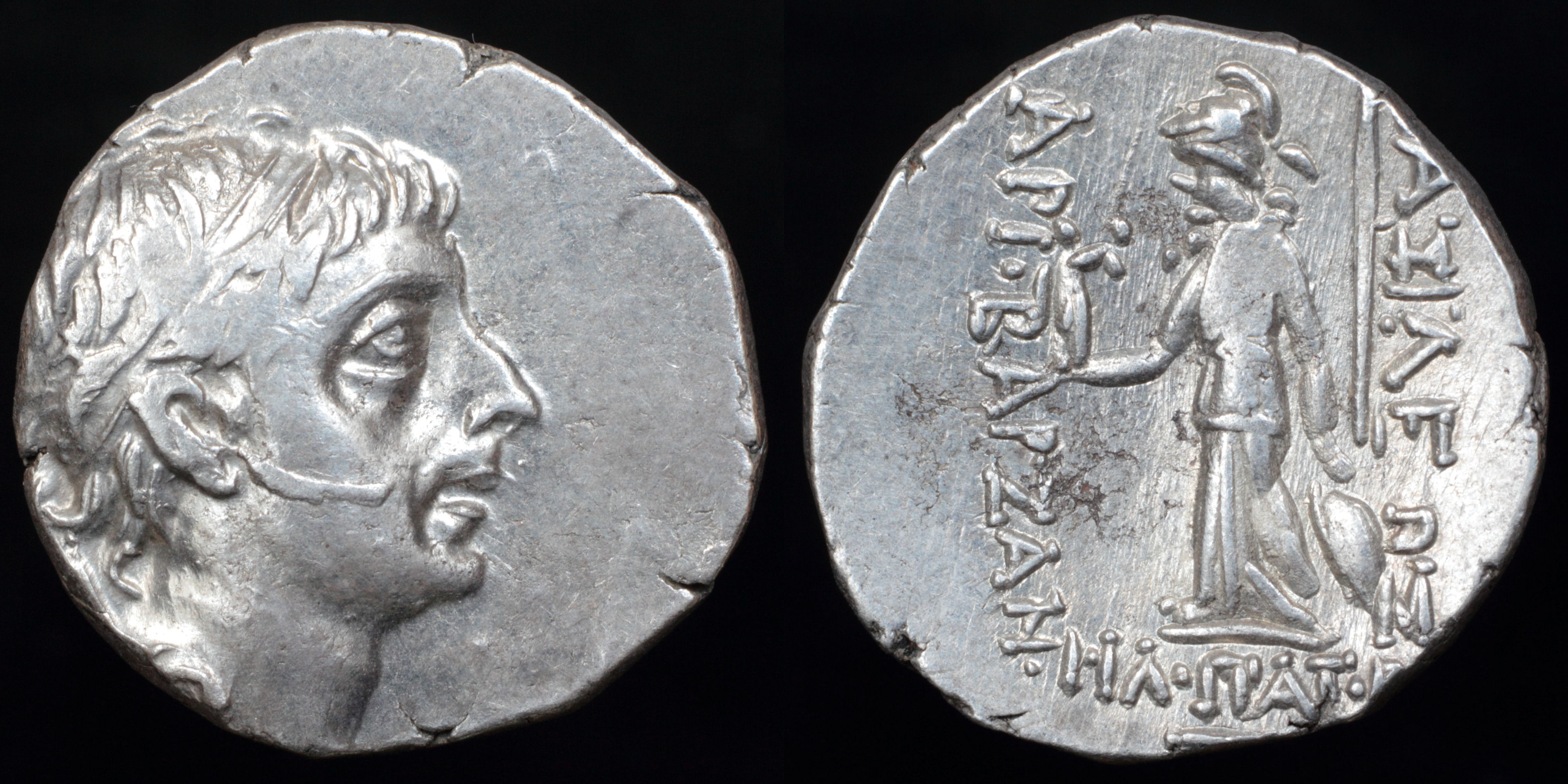

First side of the image: O: Diademed head of Ariobarzanes II
Second side of the image: R: Athena holding Nike with wreath and resting hand on shield, spear behind ΒΑΣΙΛΕΩΣ / ΑΡΙΟΒΑΡΖΑΝΟΥ / ΦΙΛΟΠΑΤΟΡΟΣ
Silver drachm struck in Eusebeia 56? BC Z? in exergue would mean 7th year of reign - 56 BC

Ariobarzanes II, surnamed Philopator, "father-loving", (Ancient Greek: Ἀριοβαρζάνης Φιλοπάτωρ, Ariobarzánēs Philopátōr), was the king of Cappadocia from c. 63 BC or 62 BC to c. 51 BC. He was the son of King Ariobarzanes I of Cappadocia and his wife Queen Athenais Philostorgos I. Ariobarzanes II was half Persian and half Greek.

Ariobarzanes II married the princess Athenais Philostorgos II, one of the daughters of King Mithridates VI of Pontus. He was an ineffective ruler, requiring the aid of Gabinius in 57 BC to ward off his enemies. He was successful in maintaining rule over Cappadocia for approximately eight years before being assassinated by Parthian favorites. By his wife, he had two sons: Ariobarzanes III of Cappadocia and Ariarathes X of Cappadocia. He was succeeded by his first son.

The Odeion of Perikles in Athens was reconstructed by Ariobarzanes II after it was destroyed by Sulla during his siege of Athens in 86 BC. An inscription from the site reads:

Those appointed by him for the construction of the Odeion, Gaius and Marcus Stallius, sons of Gaius and Menalippos, [set up the statue of] their benefactor King Ariobarzanes Philopator, son of King Ariobarzanes Philoromaios and Queen Athenais. (IG II^{2} 3426)

Preceded by Ariobarzanes I	King of Cappadocia c. 63 – c. 51 BC	Succeeded by Ariobarzanes III
