= Gordius of Cappadocia =

Gordius (in Greek Γoρδιoς), a Cappadocian by birth, was a friend and instrument of Mithridates Eupator (120–63 BC), king of Pontus, in his attempts to annex Cappadocia to Pontus. Gordius was employed by him, in 116 BC, to murder Ariarathes VI, king of Cappadocia. Gordius was afterwards tutor of a son of Mithridates, whom, after the murder of Ariarathes VII he made king of Cappadocia as Ariarathes IX. Gordius was sent as the envoy of Mithridates to Rome, and afterwards employed by him to engage Tigranes, king of Armenia, to attack Cappadocia, and expel Ariobarzanes I, whom the Romans made king of that country in 93 BC. Sulla restored Ariobarzanes in the following year, and drove Gordius out of Cappadocia. Gordius opposed Lucius Licinius Murena in the Battle of Halys, 82 BC.
