= Ariarathes III of Cappadocia =

3rd-century BC king of Cappadocia

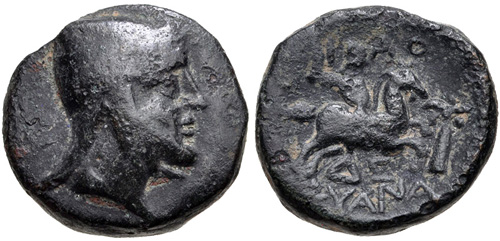
Coin of Ariarathes III

Ariarathes III (Ancient Greek: Ἀριαράθης, Ariaráthēs; reigned 262 or 255 – 220 BC), son of Ariaramnes, ruler of Cappadocia, and grandson of Ariarathes II, married Stratonice, a daughter of Antiochus II, king of the Seleucid Empire and wife Laodice I, and obtained a share in the government during the lifetime of his father. About 250 BC he was the first ruler of Cappadocia to proclaim himself king (basileus). It is known that he sided with Antiochus Hierax in his war against Seleucus II Callinicus. Ariarathes is also said to have expanded his kingdom adding Cataonia to his dominions. By his marriage he was the father of Ariarathes IV.

== Notes ==
Regnal titles
Preceded by Ariaramnes	King of Cappadocia; 255 BC – 220 BC	Succeeded by Ariarathes IV
