= Athenais Philostorgos I =

Queen of Cappadocia (fl. 1st century BC)

Athenais Philostorgos I, her surname can be spelt as Philostorgus (Greek: η Άθηναἷς Φιλόστοργος Α', meaning Athenais the loving one, flourished 1st century BC) was a Queen of Cappadocia.

Athenais was a Greek noblewoman of obscure origins. She was the wife of the Cappadocian Persian nobleman and King Ariobarzanes I Philoromaios and through her marriage became a Queen of Cappadocia. Ariobarzanes I reigned as King of Cappadocia from 95 to 63/62 BC.

It appears when Ariobarzanes I reigned as King he married Athenais as his Queen. Little is known on how she reigned as Queen and her relationship with her family. Athenais bore Ariobarzanes I two children: a son Ariobarzanes II Philopator[1] who later succeeded his father as King and a daughter, Isias Philostorgos who later married the King Antiochus I Theos of Commagene.

Athenais is also known through a surviving honorific inscription dedicated to her son in Athens, Greece dating from the mid 1st century BC.

King Ariobarzanes Philopator, son of King
Ariobarzanes Philoromaios and of Queen
Athenais Philostorgos, (is honored by) those who had been commissioned
by him for the construction of the Odeion,
Gaius and Marcus Stallius, sons of Gaius, and
Menalippos, as their benefactor.

== Sources ==
- https://web.archive.org/web/20131102190417/http://www.ancientlibrary.com/smith-bio/0412.html
- Sherk, R. K. Rome and the Greek East to the death of Augustus, Cambridge University Press, 1984
