= Ariarathes II of Cappadocia =

3rd-century BC king of Cappadocia

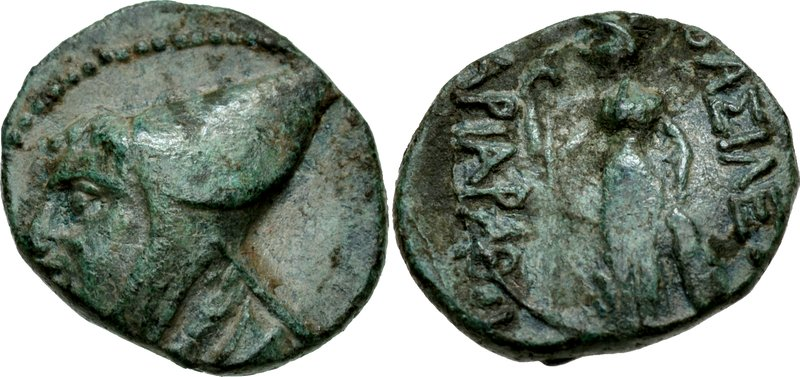
Coin of Ariarathes II

Ariarathes II (Ancient Greek: Ἀριαράθης, Ariaráthēs; ruled 301–280 BC), was a satrap and king of Cappadocia. He was the son of Holophernes.

Ariathes fled to Armenia after the death of his uncle and adopted father, Ariarathes I. After the death of Eumenes, he recovered Cappadocia with the assistance of Ardoates, the Armenian king, and killed Amyntas, the Macedonian satrap, in 301 BC, but was forced to accept Seleucid suzerainty. He was succeeded by Ariaramnes, the eldest of his three sons.

== Sources ==
- Boyce, Mary; Grenet, Frantz (1991). Beck, Roger (ed.). A History of Zoroastrianism, Zoroastrianism under Macedonian and Roman Rule. Leiden: Brill. ISBN 978-9004293915.
- Hazel, John (2001). Who's Who in the Greek World (1 ed.). Routledge. ISBN 978-0415260329.
- Raditsa, Leo (1983). "Iranians in Asia Minor". In Yarshater, Ehsan (ed.). The Cambridge History of Iran, Vol. 3 (1): The Seleucid, Parthian and Sasanian periods. Cambridge University Press. ISBN 978-1139054942.
- Shahbazi, A. Shapur (1986). "Ariyāramna". Encyclopaedia Iranica, Vol. II, Fasc. 4. pp. 410–411.

Regnal titles
Preceded by Ariarathes I	King of Cappadocia; 301 BC – 280 BC	Succeeded by Ariaramnes
