= Ariarathes X of Cappadocia =

King of Cappadocia

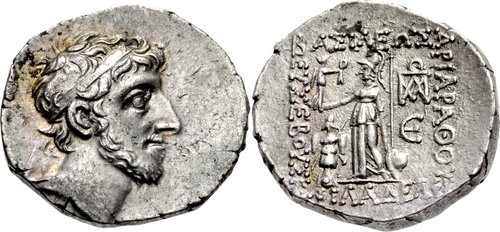
Silver drachma of Ariarathes. Obverse: portrait of Ariarathes. Reverse: Athena standing before an altar, holding Nike, shield, and spear. Caption: ΑΡΙΑΡΑΘΟΥ ΕΥΣΕΒΟΥΣ ΦΙΛΑΔΕΛΦΟΥ (Of Ariarathes, the pious, brother-loving). Year: E΄ = 5 = 37 BC.

Ariarathes X, surnamed Eusebes Philadelphos, "Pious, brother-loving" (Ancient Greek: Ἀριαράθης Εὐσεβής Φιλάδελφος, Ariaráthēs Eusebḗs Philádelphos), was the king of Cappadocia from c. 42 BC to 36 BC. He was of Persian and Greek ancestry. His father was King Ariobarzanes II of Cappadocia and his mother was Queen Athenais. He became king after his brother Ariobarzanes III Philoromaios was killed. His rule did not last long as Mark Antony of Rome removed and executed him, replacing him with Sisines, who became Archelaus of Cappadocia.

| Preceded by Ariobarzanes III Eusebes Philoromaios | Ruler of Cappadocia c. 42 BC – 36 BC | Succeeded by Archelaus |
