= Ariobarzanes I of Cappadocia =

King of Cappadocia

Ariobarzanes I
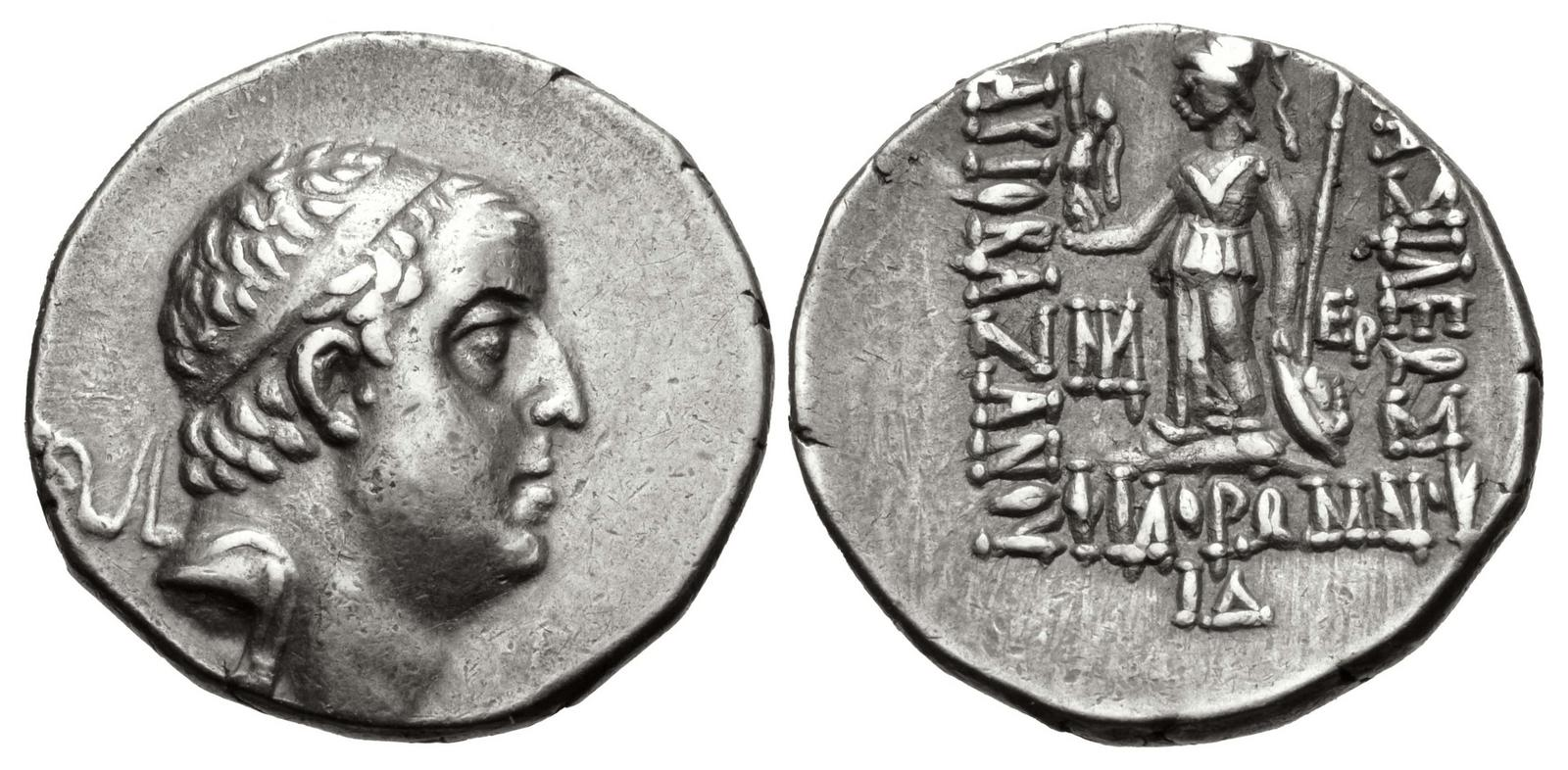
- Coin of Ariobarzanes, minted at Mazaca in 83/82 BC

King of Cappadocia
- Reign: 95–63/62 BC
- Predecessor: Ariarathes VIII (Ariarathid dynasty)
- Successor: Ariobarzanes II
- Rival: Ariarathes IX (95-85 BC)
- Spouse: Athenais Philostorgos I
- Issue: Ariobarzanes II

Ariobarzanes I (Ancient Greek: Ἀριοβαρζάνης), surnamed Philoromaios (Ancient Greek: Φιλορώμαιος, romanized: Philorṓmaios, "Friend to the Romans"), was the first Ariobarzanid king of Cappadocia from 95 BC to 63/62 BC. Ariobarzanes I was a Cappadocian nobleman of obscure origins who was of Persian descent.

== Name ==
"Ariobarzanes" is the Greek form of the Old Iranian name *Ārya-bṛzāna-, possibly meaning "exalting the Aryans". It is uncertain whether Ariobarzanes had adopted this name at his accession or that it was a personal one.

== Biography ==
Ariobarzanes belonged to one of the Persian aristocratic families of Cappadocia. Like the previous ruling Ariarathid dynasty, Ariobarzanes also claimed to be a direct descendant of the companions of Darius the Great (r. 522–486 BC), the king of the Achaemenid Empire (550–330 BC). Ariobarzanes continued to mint the same Greek-style coins as the Ariarathids, albeit with a new addition. As a demonstration of his political allegiance with the Romans, he adopted the Roman veristic style on his portraits.

Ariobarzanes I was originally put in place by the citizens vote of Cappadocia after the Roman Senate rejected the claims of Ariarathes IX of Cappadocia and was supported by the Roman consul Lucius Cornelius Sulla. He was in control on-and-off of a kingdom that was considered a Roman protectorate and he was removed three separate times by King Mithridates before not only securing but actually increasing his lands under general Pompey in the Third Mithridatic War. He eventually abdicated, making way for the rule of his son Ariobarzanes II of Cappadocia in 63/62 BC.

Ariobarzanes' queen was a Greek noblewoman, Athenais Philostorgos I. Athenais bore Ariobarzanes I two children: a son, Ariobarzanes II, who succeeded him, and a daughter, Isias, who married the King Antiochus I Theos of Commagene.

== Sources ==
- Canepa, Matthew (2018). The Iranian Expanse: Transforming Royal Identity Through Architecture, Landscape, and the Built Environment, 550 BCE–642 CE. Oakland: University of California Press. ISBN 9780520379206.
- Dandamayev, M. A.; Shahbazi, A. Sh.; Lecoq, P. (1986). "Ariobarzanes". In Yarshater, Ehsan (ed.). Encyclopædia Iranica. Vol. II/4: Architecture IV–Armenia and Iran IV. London and New York: Routledge & Kegan Paul. pp. 406–409. ISBN 978-0-71009-104-8.
- Miller, Margaret C. (2017). "Quoting 'Persia' in Athens". In Strootman, Rolf; Versluys, Miguel John (eds.). Persianism in Antiquity. Franz Steiner Verlag. pp. 49–69. ISBN 978-3515113823.

Preceded by Ariarathes VIII	King of Cappadocia; 95–63/62 BC	Succeeded by Ariobarzanes II Philopator
