= Ariarathes VI of Cappadocia =

King of Cappadocia from 130 BC to 116 BC

Ariarathes VI
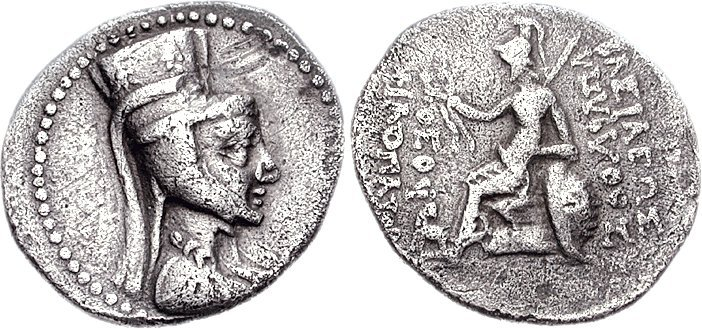
- Rare silver drachm of Ariarathes VI wearing a tiara

King of Cappadocia
- Reign: 130–116 BC
- Predecessor: Ariarathes V
- Successor: Ariarathes VII
- Died: 116 BC
- Spouse: Laodice of Cappadocia
- Issue: Nysa (wife of Nicomedes III of Bithynia); Ariarathes VII of Cappadocia; Ariarathes VIII of Cappadocia
- Dynasty: Ariarathid
- Father: Ariarathes V
- Mother: Nysa of Cappadocia

Ariarathes VI Epiphanes Philopator (Ancient Greek: Ἀριαράθης Ἐπιφανής Φιλοπάτωρ), was the Ariarathid king of Cappadocia from 130 BC to 116 BC. He was the youngest son of Ariarathes V of Cappadocia and Nysa of Cappadocia.

== Name ==
"Ariarathes" is the Hellenized form of an Old Iranian name, perhaps *Arya-wratha ("having Aryan joy"). The name is attested in Aramaic as Ariorath or Ariourat, and in later Latin sources as Ariaratus.

== Reign ==
He was a child at his succession, and for this reason the power was kept by his mother, who acted as his regent. At some point his mother seems to have poisoned all of Ariarathes’ five brothers; but the infant king was saved by people loyal to the dynasty and had Nysa killed. Using this as a pretext, his maternal uncle, King Mithridates V Euergetes of Pontus (150 BC–120 BC), tried to assert control over the country by marrying Ariarathes to Mithridates' first daughter, Laodice of Cappadocia, who was also Ariarathes' maternal cousin. Laodice bore Ariarathes one daughter and two sons: Nysa who married King Nicomedes III Euergetes of Bithynia; Ariarathes VII Philometor and Ariarathes VIII Epiphanes.

Since this wasn't deemed enough to transform Cappadocia in a satellite of Pontus, Mithridates V Euergetes' son, Mithridates VI, murdered Ariarathes using Gordius, a Cappadocian nobleman. On his death the kingdom was briefly ruled by Ariarathes' widow and then seized by King Nicomedes III of Bithynia, who married Laodice, the king's widow. Nicomedes III was soon expelled by Mithridates VI, who placed upon the throne Ariarathes VII.

== Coinage and Imperial ideology ==
While most Cappadocian kings preferred to portray themselves with a Hellenistic diadem, Ariarathes VI combined the diadem with a rare tiara, thus portraying himself in a royal Iranian manner. However, he still continued to mint coins of himself wearing a diadem only, while coins of him wearing a tiara was mainly used on his tetradrachms, which implies that it was probably done with the purpose for the grandees and kings of Armenia, Commagene, Pontus, and possibly Parthia, to see it. The modern historian Matthew Canepa (2017) suggested that Ariarathes VI minted these two different types of images "to promote both cultural backgrounds in the numismatic medium intended for the army, court and foreign circulation."

== Sources ==
- Brunner, C. J. (1986). "Ariaratus". In Yarshater, Ehsan (ed.). Encyclopædia Iranica. Vol. II/4: Architecture IV–Armenia and Iran IV. London and New York: Routledge & Kegan Paul. p. 406. ISBN 978-0-71009-104-8.
- Canepa, Matthew (2017). "Rival Images of Iranian Kingship and Persian Identity in Post-Achaemenid Western Asia". In Strootman, Rolf; Versluys, M. J. (eds.). Persianism in Antiquity. Franz Steiner Verlag. ISBN 9783515113823.
- Erciyas, Deniz Burcu (2006). Wealth, Aristocracy And Royal Propaganda Under the Hellenistic Kingdom of the Mithradatids in the Central Black Sea Region of Turkey. Leiden: Brill. ISBN 978-9004146099.
- Hazel, John (2001). Who's Who in the Greek World (1 ed.). Routledge. ISBN 978-0415260329.
- Sherwin-White, Susan M. (1984). "Asia Minor". In Ling, Roger (ed.). The Cambridge Ancient History: Plates to Volumes VII, part 1. Cambridge: Cambridge University Press. ISBN 978-0521243544.

Preceded by Ariarathes V	King of Cappadocia; 130 BC – 116 BC	Succeeded by Ariarathes VII
