= Ariarathes VIII of Cappadocia =

2nd and 1st-century BC king of Cappadocia

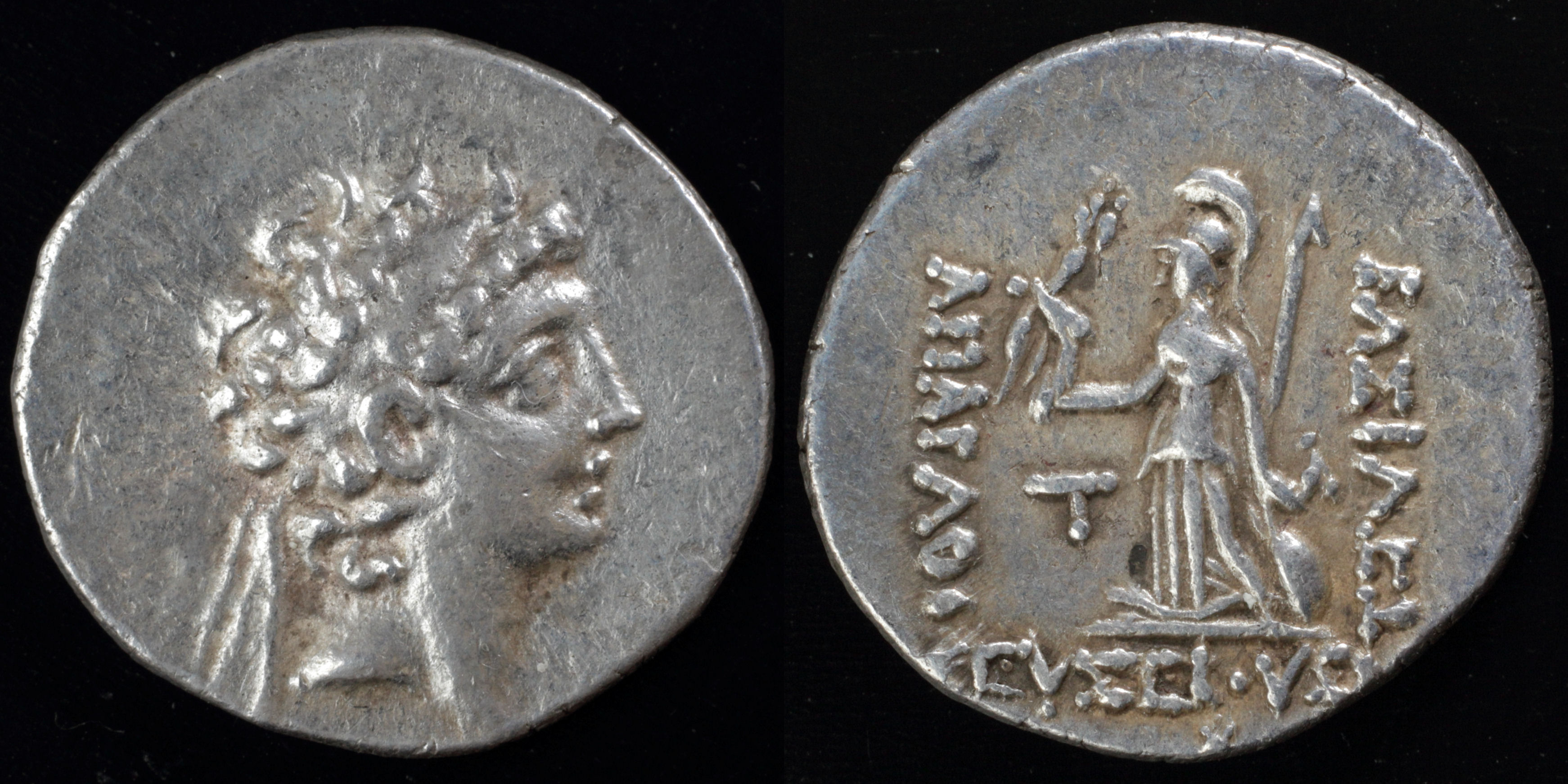
O: Diademed head of Ariarathes VIII
R: Athena holding Nike with wreath and resting hand on shield, spear behind; T left, Λ right

ΒΑΣΙΛΕΩΣ / ΑΡΙΑΡΑΘΟΥ / ΕΥΣΕΒΟΥΣ

Silver drachm struck in Eusebeia 99-98 BC

B in exergue is a greek numeral meaning 2nd year of reign

Ariarathes VIII Epiphanes (Ancient Greek: Ἀριαράθης Ἐπιφανής, Ariaráthēs Epiphanḗs; reigned c. 101–c. 96 BC and in 95), King of Cappadocia, was the second son of Ariarathes VI of Cappadocia and wife Laodice of Cappadocia. Ariarathes VIII had an older sister called Nysa and an older brother called Ariarathes VII of Cappadocia.

Ariarathes ascended to the throne when the Cappadocian nobleman rebelled against his maternal uncle, King Mithridates VI of Pontus and his son, the puppet King Ariarathes IX of Cappadocia. He was speedily driven out of the kingdom by Mithridates VI, and shortly afterwards died a natural death.

The death of both sons of Ariarathes VI meant that the Cappadocian royal family was extinct. So Mithridates VI placed upon the Cappadocian throne his own son Ariarathes IX, who was only eight years old. However, King Nicomedes III of Bithynia sent an embassy to Rome to lay claim to the Cappadocian throne for a youth, whom, he pretended, was a third son of Ariarathes VI and Laodice. According to Justin, Mithridates VI also, with equal shamelessness, sent an embassy to Rome to assert that the youth, whom he had placed upon the throne, was a descendant of Ariarathes V of Cappadocia, who fell in the war against King Eumenes III of Pergamon. The Roman Senate, however, did not assign the kingdom to either but granted liberty to the Cappadocians and, in 95, ordered to depose Ariarathes IX. After a short period of direct Pontic rule and a brief restoration of Ariarathes VIII, an attempt to restore a Cappadocian republic was made by the Roman Senate. As the people wished for a king, the Romans allowed them to choose whom they pleased, and their choice fell upon Ariobarzanes I.

Preceded by Ariarathes VII	King of Cappadocia; 101 BC – 96 BC	Succeeded by Ariarathes IX
