= Ariarathes IX of Cappadocia =

Ariarathes IX Eusebes Philopator
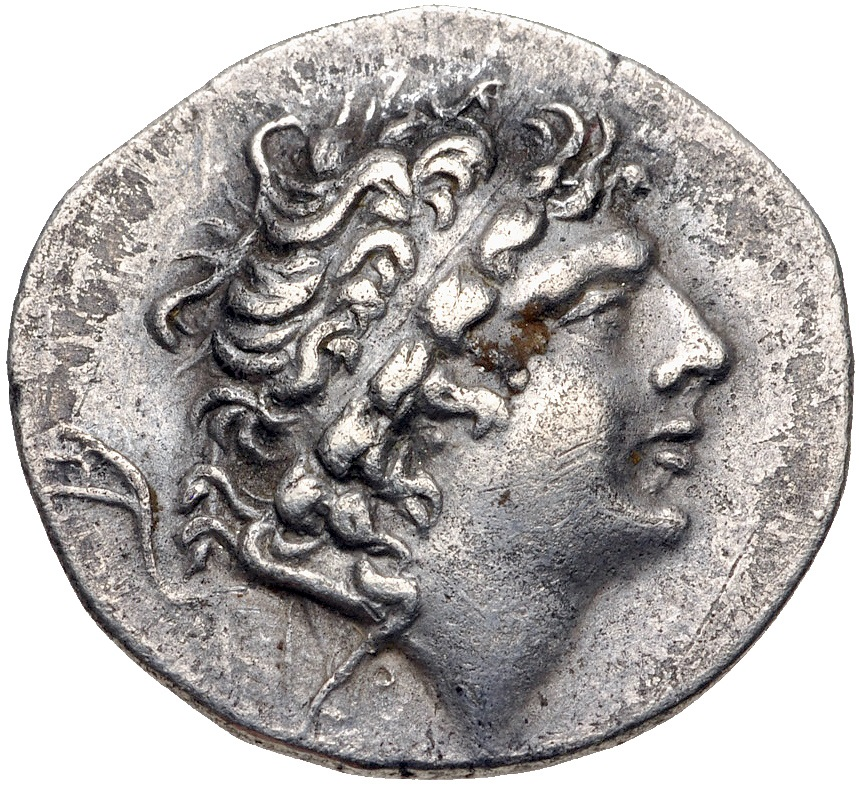
- Drachm of Ariarathes IX of Cappadocia struck in regnal year 13 or 15 (88/7 or 86/5 BC), showing idealized features of his father Mithridates VI of Pontus.

King of Cappadocia
- Reign: c. 100–85 BC (In opposition to Ariarathes VIII of Cappadocia 100-95 BC and Ariobarzanes I of Cappadocia 95-85 BC)
- Predecessor: Ariarathes VII; Ariarathes VIII
- Successor: Ariobarzanes I
- Rival: Ariarathes VIII (c. 100–85 BC); Ariobarzanes I (95-85 BC)
- Born: c. 108 BC
- Died: c. 85 BC; Northern Greece
- Dynasty: Mithridatic dynasty
- Father: Mithridates VI of Pontus

Ariarathes IX Eusebes Philopator (Ancient Greek: Ἀριαράθης Εὐσεβής Φιλοπάτωρ, Ariaráthēs Eusebḗs Philopátōr; reigned c. 100–85 BC), was made king of Cappadocia by his father Mithridates VI of Pontus after the assassination of Ariarathes VII of Cappadocia in c. 100 BC. Since he was only eight years old, he was put under the regency of the Cappadocian Gordius.

Early in his reign Cappadocian nobility quickly drove him from power in favor of a son of Ariarathes VI of Cappadocia, named Ariarathes VIII of Cappadocia. In 95 BC Mithridates VI of Pontus entered Cappadocia with an army deposing Ariarathes VIII of Cappadocia and restoring his son to the throne. After a short period of Pontic rule, the Roman Senate intervened and forced him to return the throne to Ariarathes VIII of Cappadocia, after a brief restoration and an attempt of creation of a republic, the Roman Senate directed the Cappadocians to vote by who they wanted to be ruled, and thus the kingdom passed to Ariobarzanes I Philoromaios.

Nevertheless, due to invasions of Cappadocia by Tigranes II of Armenia, the brother-in-law of Ariarathes IX, Ariobarzanes I of Cappadocia was deposed and Ariarathes IX of Cappadocia was again restored to power on separate occasions in 93 BC and 92 BC. However, as soon as Tigranes II of Armenia and his army returned home, Ariarathes IX of Cappadocia was deposed again by order of the Senate. Ariarathes IX of Cappadocia was restored to the throne for the last time at the outbreak of the First Mithridatic War (89-85 BC). He remained king of Cappadocia during the war but was forced to abdicate after his father Mithridates VI of Pontus was defeated by the Romans in 85 BC. His last drachms minted in Cappadocia showed the symbol for regnal year 15, which corresponds to 86/5 BC.

According to Plutarch, Ariarathes IX was poisoned by his father (presumably while serving as a commander of his father's troops in northern Greece during the First Mithridatic War):

In the fortress of Caenum, Pompey found also private documents belonging to Mithridates, and read them with no little satisfaction, since they shed much light upon the king's character. For there were memoranda among them from which it was discovered that, besides many others, he had poisoned to death his son Ariarathes, and also Alcaeus of Sardis, because Alcaeus had surpassed him in driving race-horses.

== Coinage ==
The first coinage of Ariarathes IX of Cappadocia show the portrait of the young king with features that are reminiscent of earlier Cappadocian kings. The coins are of typical Cappadocian style, with Athena on the reverse and his title Eusebes, from his full title Eusebes Philopater. Soon after the coins started to bear a portrait which was much closer to that of his father Mithridates VI of Pontus, Dr. Imhoof-Blumer suggests that this portrait is actually the head of Mithridates VI of Pontus himself, and not that of his son Ariarathes IX.

The reason for this change is uncertain, but Mørkholm believes that when a group of Cappadocian nationalists revolted and promoted Ariarathes VIII of Cappadocia as king, Mithridates VI of Pontus suppressed the revolt ca. 95 BC, and placed his portrait on the coinage pronouncing his rule over the Cappadocians. In regnal year 13 and 15, which is 88/7 and 86/5 BC the drachms of Ariarathes IX show again a portrait of his father Mithridates VI of Pontus, during that time, the First Mithridatic War had started, and by placing his portrait on his son's coins he made their relationship perfectly clear to all beholders.

Preceded by Ariarathes VII	King of Cappadocia c. 100 BC – 85 BC	Succeeded by Ariobarzanes I Philoromaios
