= Ariarathes VII of Cappadocia =

King of Cappadocia in the 2nd century BC

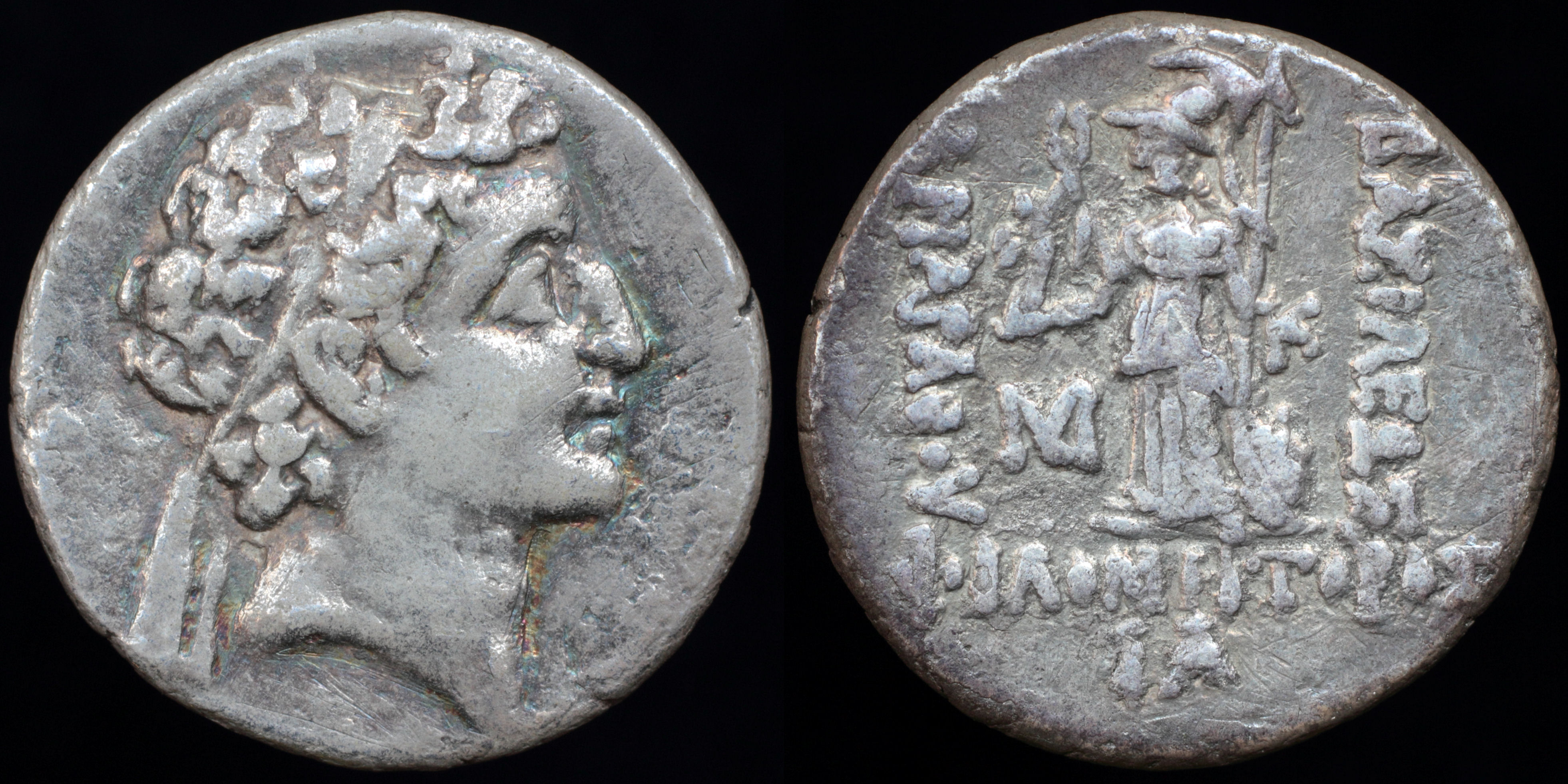

First side of the image: O: Diademed head of Ariarathes VII
Second side of the image: R: Athena holding Nike with wreath and resting hand on shield, spear behind; monograms in field ΒΑΣΙΛΕΩΣ / ΑΡΙΑΡΑΘΟΥ / ΦΙΛΟΜΗΤΟΡΟΣ
Silver drachm struck in Eusebeia or Tyana 106 BC; ref.: SNGCop 141 IA in exergue is a Greek numeral and means 11th year of reign

Ariarathes VII Philometor ("mother-loving") (Ancient Greek: Ἀριαράθης Φιλομήτωρ, Ariaráthēs Philomḗtōr; reigned in 116–101 BC or 111–100 BC), King of Cappadocia, was the first son of King Ariarathes VI of Cappadocia and his wife Laodice of Cappadocia. Ariarathes VII had an older sister called Nysa and a younger brother called Ariarathes VIII of Cappadocia.

In his first years he reigned under the regency of his mother Laodice, the eldest sister of the King Mithridates VI of Pontus. During this period the kingdom was seized by King Nicomedes III of Bithynia, who married Nysa. Nicomedes III was soon expelled by Mithridates VI, who restored upon the throne Ariarathes VII. However, Ariarathes objected to Gordius, his father's assassin and ally of Mithridates VI, having a role in the government of Cappadocia. So Mithridates had Ariarathes VII murdered in 101 BC. Mithridates VI then put onto the Cappadocian throne his own 9-year-old son, Ariarathes IX of Cappadocia, with Gordius as regent for the young king.

Preceded by Ariarathes VI	King of Cappadocia; 116 BC – 101 BC	Succeeded by Ariarathes IX
