= Pergamon Bridge =

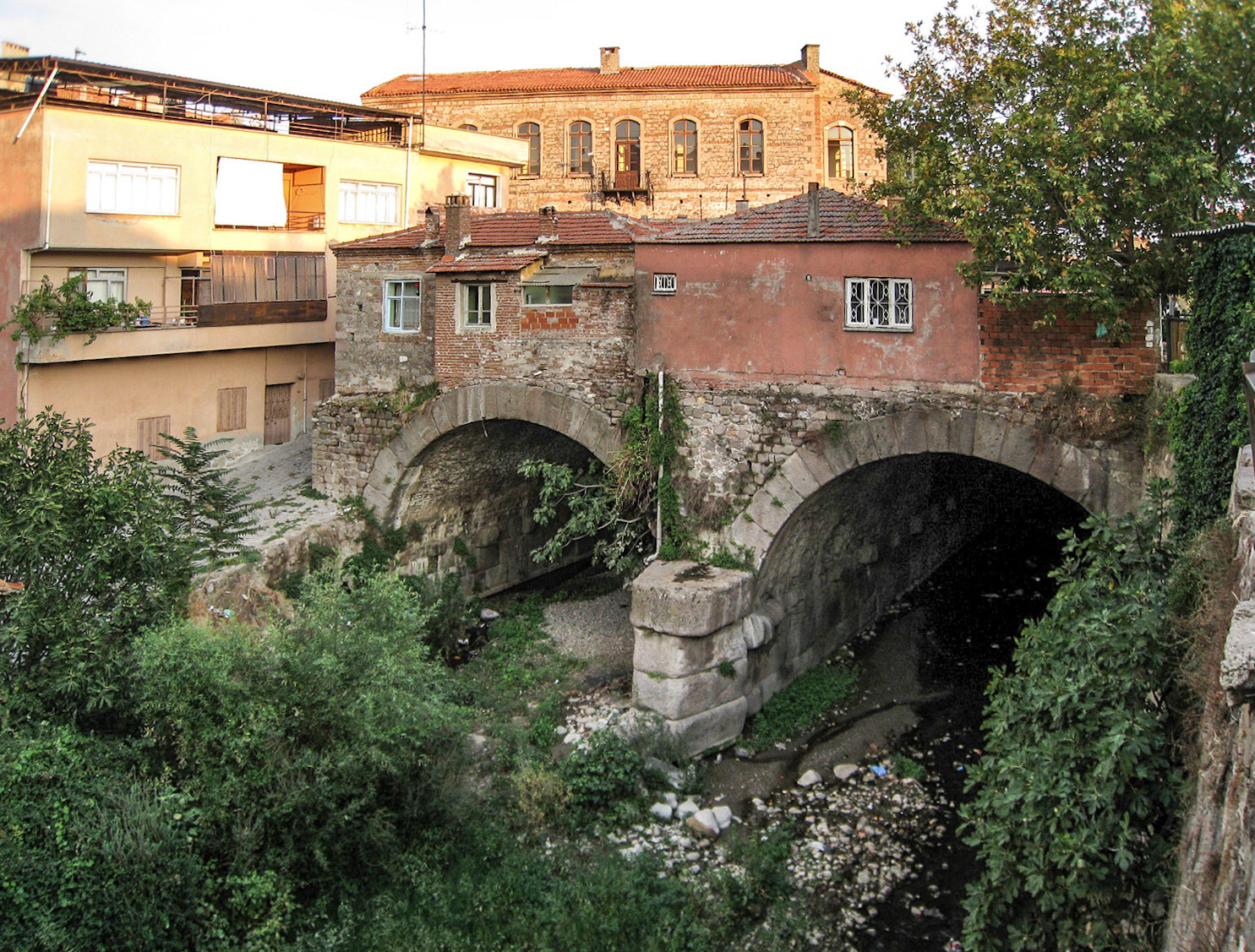
- Western entrance of the bridge
- Coordinates: 39.121583°N 27.182667°E
- Carries: Red Basilica square
- Crosses: Selinus (Bergama Çayi)
- Locale: Pergamon, Turkey

Characteristics
- Design: Arch bridge
- Material: Rubble masonry, ashlar
- Width: 183 resp. 196 m
- Longest span: 9 m
- No. of spans: 2
- Piers in water: 1
- Clearance below: 7.5 m

History
- Construction end: Reign of Hadrian (AD 117–138)

The Pergamon Bridge is a Roman substruction bridge over the Selinus river (modern Bergama Çayı) in the ancient city of Pergamon (today Bergama), modern-day Turkey. The 196 m (643 ft) wide structure, the largest of its kind in antiquity, was designed during Hadrian's reign (AD 117–138) in order to form a passageway underneath a large court in front of the monumental "Red Basilica" temple complex. The two intact tubes, which consist of supporting walls covered with barrel vaults, still serve their purpose to this day.

== Classification as bridge substruction ==
Although the Pergamon Bridge is, due to its extraordinary width, often misleadingly called a tunnel, it should rather be treated as a bridge substruction, since the entire structure was erected above ground, which necessitates construction techniques more akin to bridge building and very different from those employed in tunnel-driving.

For urban development, such substructions are regarded as particularly useful for providing large open spaces in densely populated inner city areas. This was also the case in Pergamon, as the building of the Serapis Temple required the bridging of an entire section of the River Selinus in order to create sufficient space for a large platform in front of the temple.

A similar urban project was also executed in another ancient Anatolian city, Nysa, where the 100 m (328 ft) wide Nysa Bridge supported a theatre forecourt.

== Vault structure ==
The bridge substruction features two parallel and linear barrel vaults which are separated by a continuously running partition wall. While the uphill entrances of the double tube are on the same level, the exits on the down-valley side are spaced at a 13 m (43 ft) interval, leading to a significant difference in length between the western (183 m (600 ft)) and the eastern branch (196 m (643 ft)). Due to a later built-in 2 m (6 ft 7 in) high threshold, parts of the western tube are today silted up.

The dimensions of both semi-circular arches are practically identical: the clear spans are 9 m (30 ft) each, the rise from the springing line to the apex of the arch 4.5 m (15 ft) and the clearance to ground level measures 7.5 m (25 ft). The vaults are built of rubble bound with mortar, and rest on an ashlar stone base.

Up- and downstream of the bridge substruction are another two well-preserved ancient bridges across the Selinus, called Tabak Köprüsü and Üc Kemer Köprüsü ("Three Arch Bridge").

== Discharge capacity ==
The capacity limit of the Pergamon Bridge in case of floods has been the subject of hydraulic and hydrological research. The gradient of the tunnel was calculated as 0.6% with a maximum discharge capacity of 360 m³/s. Exceeding this limit puts the bridge under internal pressure and damages the structure in the process. Considering that the Selinus is 13.4 km (8.3 mi) long, with a median gradient of 2.2% and a drainage basin of 101 km^{2} (39 sq mi), the following median intervals were calculated, depending on the method employed:

- 250 years (Günerman method)
- 550 years (D.S.I. method)
- 1,100 years (Mockus method)
- 8,500 years (Snyder method)

The study came to the conclusion that statistically every 700 years, a value which has been referred to as the "arithmetic mean", floods are to be expected which would exceed the capacity of the bridge.

== See also ==
- List of Roman bridges
- Roman architecture
- Roman engineering

== Sources ==
- Grewe, Klaus; Özis, Ünal (1994), "Die antiken Flußüberbauungen von Pergamon und Nysa (Türkei)", Antike Welt, 25 (4): 348–352
