= Red Basilica =

Ancient Roman buildings and structures in Turkey

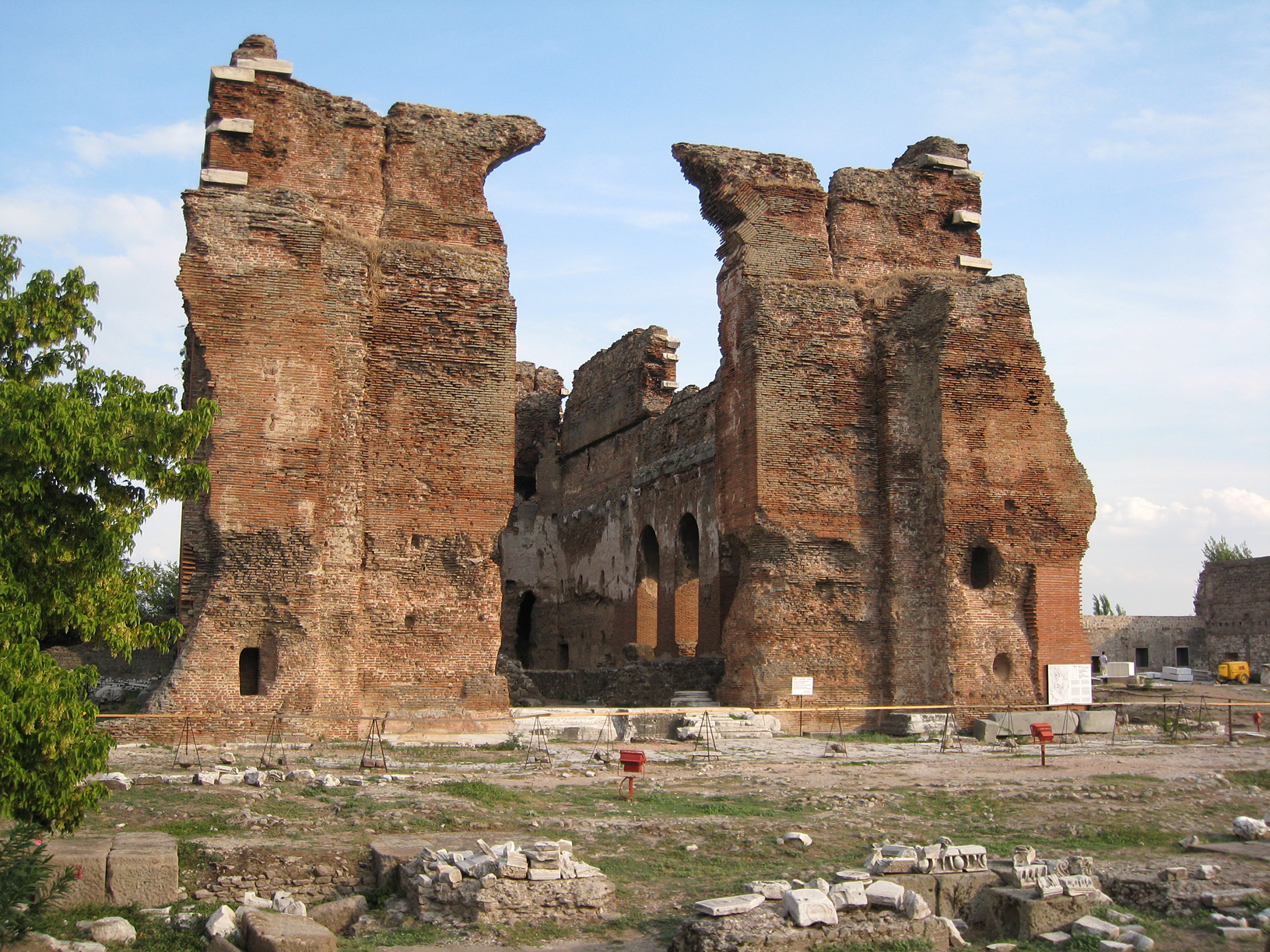
- Interactive map of Red Basilica
- Location: Bergama, Turkey
- Coordinates: 39.1219°N 27.1833°E
- Type: Roman temple
- Completion date: 2nd century AD
- Dedicated to: Hadrian?

The "Red Basilica" (Turkish: Kızıl Avlu), also called variously the Red Hall and Red Courtyard, is a monumental ruined temple in the ancient city of Pergamon, now Bergama, in western Turkey. The temple was built during the Roman Empire, probably in the time of Hadrian and possibly on his orders. It is one of the largest Roman structures still surviving in the ancient Greek world. The temple is thought to have been used for the worship of Egyptian gods – specifically Isis and/or Serapis, and possibly also Osiris, Harpocrates and other lesser gods, who may have been worshipped in a pair of drum-shaped rotundas, both of which are virtually intact, alongside the main temple.

Although the building itself is of an immense size, it was only one part of a much larger sacred complex, surrounded by high walls, that dwarfed even the colossal Temple of Jupiter in Baalbek. The entire complex was built directly over the River Selinus in a remarkable feat of engineering that involved the construction of an immense bridge 196 metres (643 ft) wide to channel the river through two channels under the temple. The Pergamon Bridge still stands today, supporting modern buildings and even vehicle traffic. A series of tunnels and chambers lies under the main temple, connecting it with the side rotundas and giving private access to different areas of the complex. Various drains, water channels and basins are located in, around and under the main temple and may have been used for symbolic reenactments of the flooding of the Nile.

The temple was converted by the Romans into a Christian church dedicated to St John but was subsequently destroyed. Today the ruins of the main temple and one of the side rotundas can be visited, while the other side rotunda is still in use as a small mosque.

== History ==
The temple's date of construction is not recorded, but from the style of the sculptures and the building techniques a date in the first half of the second century AD has been proposed. Its use of red brick on a massive scale, unique in Asia Minor but relatively common in Italy at the time, indicates that the architect was not local. The immense size and lavish construction of the complex points to an extremely wealthy patron who sent a Roman architect and brick masons to Pergamon to build the temple. The most likely candidate is the emperor Hadrian himself. He is known to have been an enthusiastic sponsor of the Egyptian gods; he built temples of Isis and Serapis at various places in the Roman world, including at his own villa in Tivoli.

At some point during the Christian era the temple was gutted by fire. It was not restored, but was redeveloped in the 5th century AD as a Christian basilica, built inside the shell of the destroyed temple. Arcades were built dividing the interior into a central nave and two side aisles. The eastern wall was demolished and replaced with an apse. The floor level was raised by about 2 metres (6.6 ft), obscuring the original Roman floor, though the former floor level has since been restored by archaeologists. The church was probably destroyed by the forces of the Arab general Maslamah ibn Abd al-Malik, who besieged and looted the city in 716–717 during his unsuccessful bid to conquer Constantinople. Pergamon fell into Turkish hands in 1336 and the building was converted into a mosque.

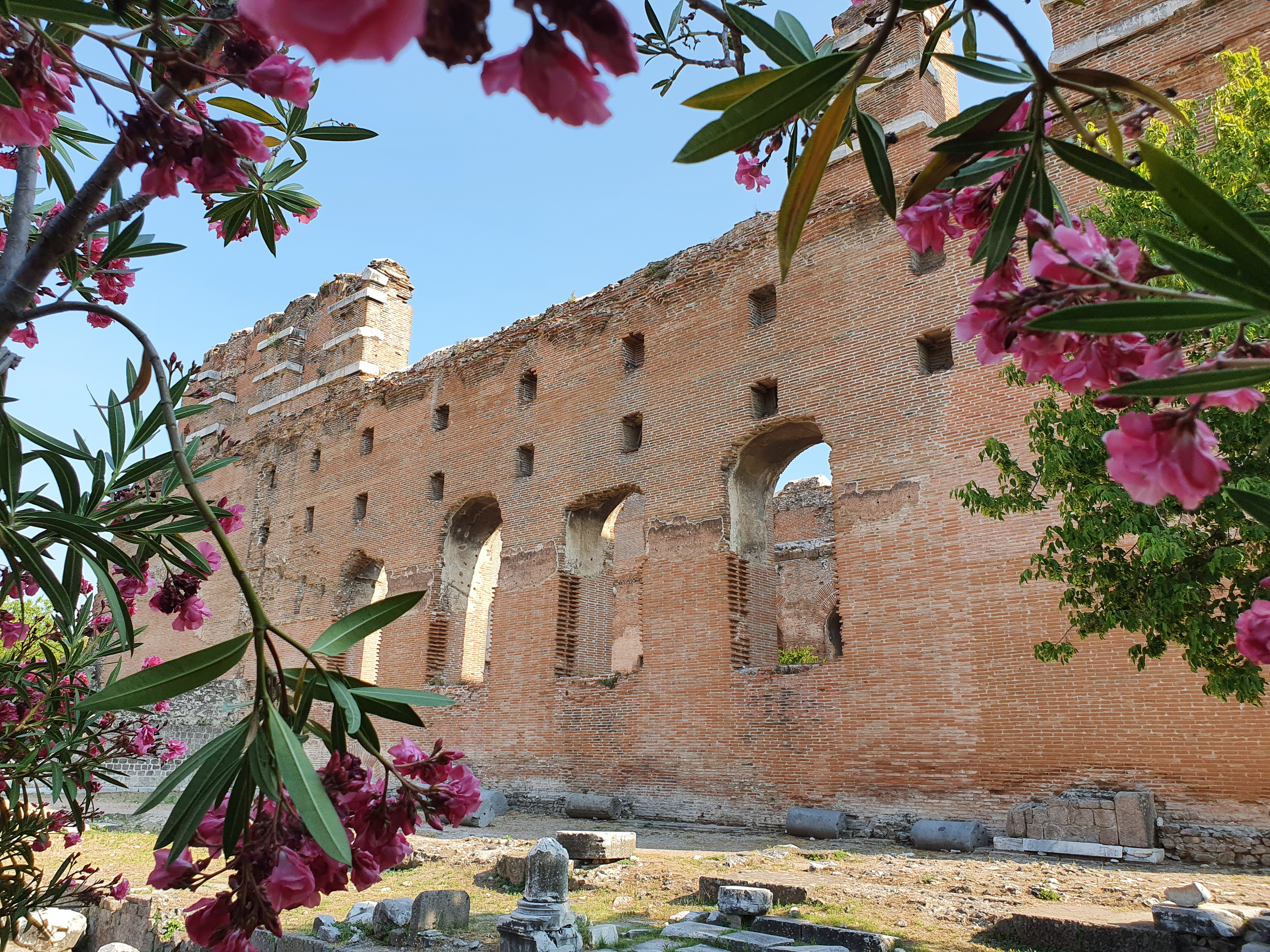
Exterior of the Red Basilica after restoration

The complex has been investigated and excavated in a series of campaigns by the German Archaeological Institute. In 1906–1909 P. Schazmann prepared detailed drawings of the ruins during a German excavation of the Hellenistic city. The temple and temenos were excavated by Theodor Wiegand from 1927. New archaeological studies were carried out from 2002 to 2005 under A. Hoffmann. Restoration efforts have also been pursued, first in the 1930s under O. Bayatlı, the Director of the Bergama Museum, and later in the 1950s and 1960s. Further restoration work was conducted on the main temple in 2006 and the south rotunda was restored between 2006 and 2009.

== Description ==
Plan of the "Red Basilica" and the surrounding complex

The temple was built in the lower city of Pergamon at the foot of the hill on which the ancient city's acropolis stood. It was located at the eastern end of what was originally an immense sacred precinct or temenos, 270 m long by 100 m wide (890 ft × 330 ft), which was surrounded by stone walls standing at least 13 metres (43 ft) high. Most of the temenos was destroyed and built over long ago, but substantial fragments of the walls remain standing to a height of 13 m today. The main entrance lay on the western side of the temenos through a colossal marble gateway; smaller gateways were located on the same side, north and south of the main gate. From there, visitors walked some 200 metres (660 ft) to an immense propylon (or monumental gateway) in front of the temple, supported by a row of columns standing 14 metres (46 ft) high.

The temenos was built on top of the River Selinus, presumably because the person who commissioned the complex wished it to be located in the city centre rather than in an outlying district. As the city was already substantially built up, the river bed offered an otherwise unused location for the temple complex and reduced the number of properties that would have to be demolished to make way for it. The river was channelled into two tunnels passing diagonally for a distance of about 150 metres (490 ft), northwest to southeast, under the temenos and temple. This structure, the Pergamon Bridge, still stands today and continues to drain the river underneath the complex.

=== The temple ===
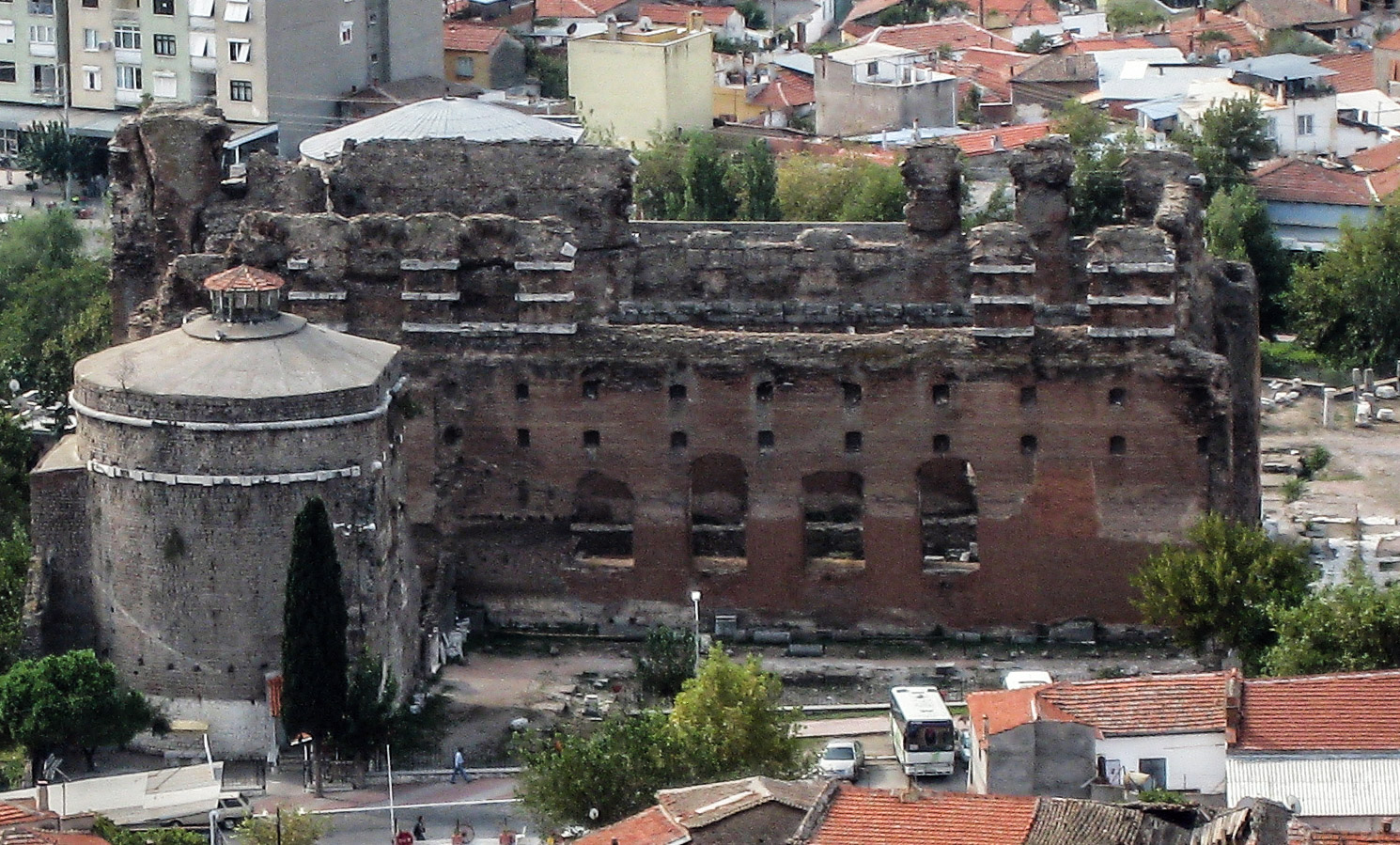
The temple viewed from the north, also showing the north rotunda. The roof of the south rotunda can just be seen on the other side.

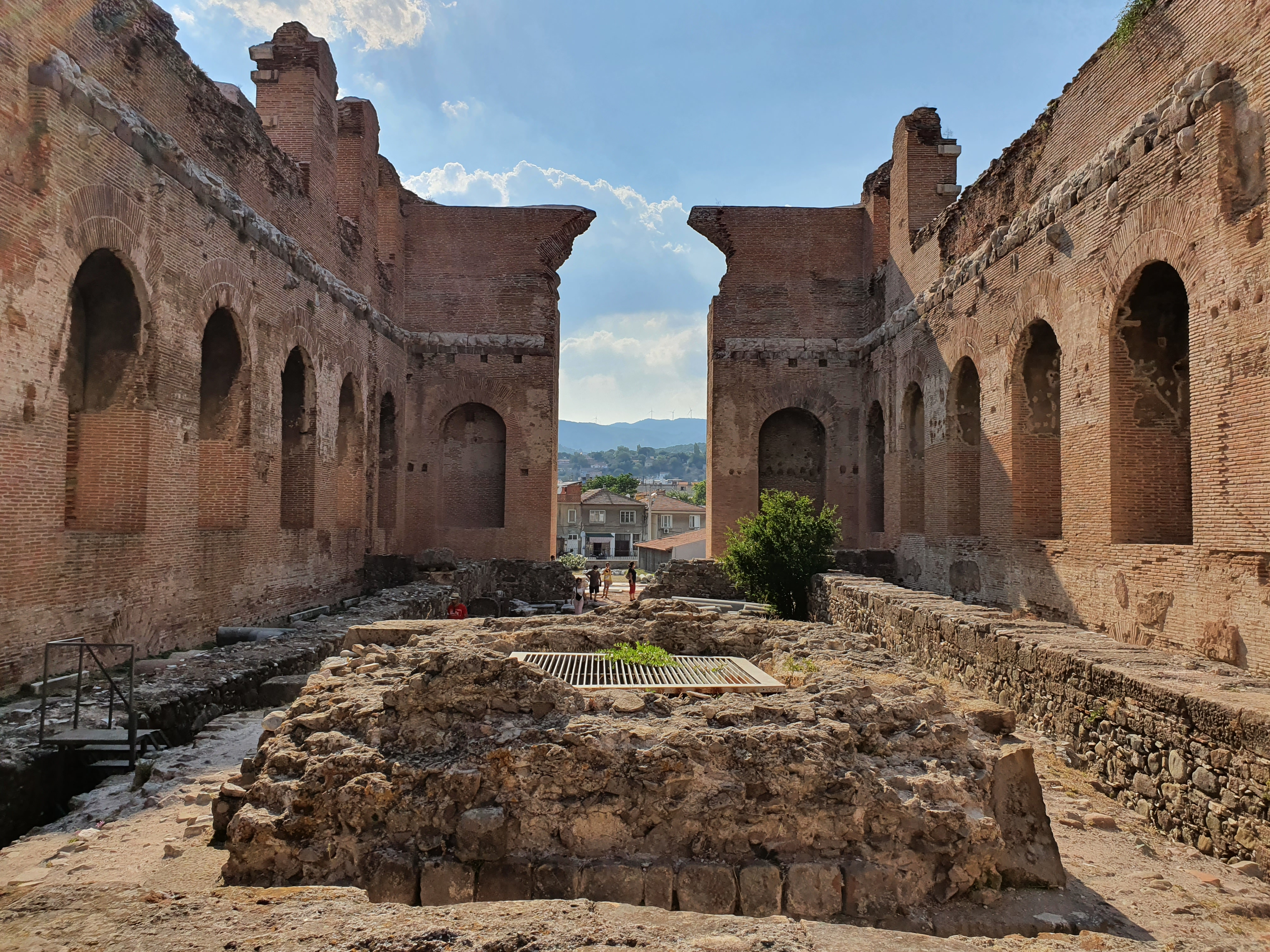
Interior of the temple, showing the podium and (left) the base of the cult statue. Smaller statues of the gods would have stood in the side alcoves.

The temple measures 60 metres (200 ft) from east to west and 26 metres (85 ft) from north to south. Its walls still survive up to a height of 19 metres (62 ft), though its roof and eastern wall no longer exist and much of the original interior was destroyed when it was converted into a Christian basilica. The building was originally a vast hall, rather than a basilica, covered by a wooden roof that had no interior support or colonnade. Its walls were built entirely of red bricks that gave the building its modern Turkish name (which means literally "Red Courtyard"). They were covered in marble in various colours, though this has entirely disappeared; some important structural parts were also constructed from marble.

There appear to have been windows only in the western half of the main temple, meaning that the eastern half did not receive any natural light (unless there were windows in the eastern wall, which no longer stands). The building was entered from the west through an immense door measuring more than 7 metres (23 ft) wide by at least 14 metres (46 ft) high. Its door-sill is still in place and was made from a single piece of marble weighing over 30 tons. It seems, however, that the door was kept open continuously as there are no traces of the rollers that would have been necessary to open and close it. In front of the door stood an iron grating, which presumably had an opening in it to permit access to the interior of the temple.

A total of twelve arched niches are embedded in the walls of the western end of the temple, five each lining the north and south walls and another two flanking the door on the west wall. They stand 2.55 metres (8 ft 4 in) wide by 6 metres (20 ft) high and presumably held statues of deities – perhaps the twelve gods of the zodiac. In his novel Metamorphoses, the Roman writer Apuleius described a visit to the temple in which his protagonist "saw the gods infernal and the gods celestial, before whom I presented myself and worshipped." Near the centre of the hall is a shallow basin, 22 centimetres (8.7 in) deep by 5.2 metres (17 ft) long, in which three rectangular tubs stood, placed parallel to each other. It had no inflow pipe or drain. The eastern and western halves of the hall are divided by an alabaster-lined water channel, 1.4 metres (4 ft 7 in) wide and 1.37 metres (4.5 ft) deep, extending the full width of the temple. This did have a substantial inflow or outlet point, 1 metre (3 ft 3 in) high by 0.45 metres (1 ft 6 in) wide, which exited somewhere to the west in the direction of the river. The floor of the temple was constructed from plates of marble and granite imported from as far away as Egypt.

The eastern end of the hall would have been closed to the public and could only be accessed by the temple priests and their attendants. It housed the cult statue, which stood on a base that stood in turn on a podium raised by 1.5 metres (4.9 ft) above the temple floor. The statue was at least 10 metres (33 ft) high, approaching the size of the great Statue of Zeus at Olympia, one of the Seven Wonders of the Ancient World. An entry-hole in the base indicates that priests could climb inside the body of the statue, perhaps to make it "speak" during ceremonies.

At the far end of the temple were two massive towers, projecting some distance out from the eastern wall of the temenos. The original wall no longer exists but from the foundations it can be seen that it would have been in the shape of an inverted semicircle. During the Christian era it was demolished and replaced with an apsidal wall.

=== Side courts and rotundas ===
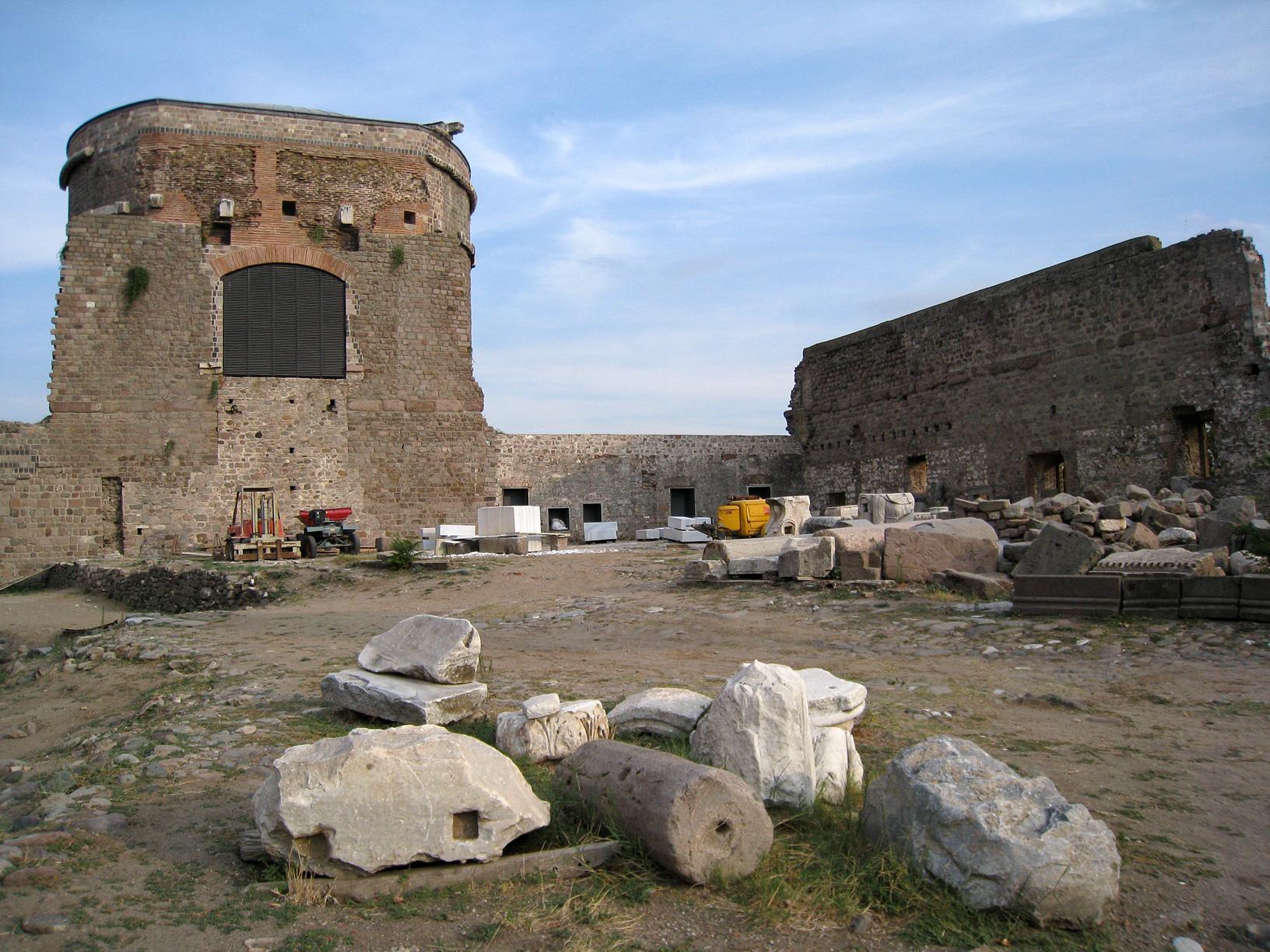
South rotunda and a surviving section of the south wall of the temenos. Holes for the beams of the stoa roof can still be seen in the temenos wall.

Two rotundas topped by domes stand on either side of the main temple. Although they have been stripped of their original marble cladding, they are still substantially intact. Each stands 18 metres (59 ft) high, with a diameter of 12 metres (39 ft), and had doors standing 11.5 metres (38 ft) high. They were lit by an opening (an opaion or oculus) that was originally 3.7 metres (12 ft) wide. The two rotundas had different fates in the modern era. The one on the south side, which is part of the Red Basilica archaeological site and is open to visitors, was re-used and modified in the Ottoman period, and in the 19th century became the machinery room for an olive oil factory. Its inside walls are still covered with black soot from the smoke produced by the machinery. The north rotunda is currently used as a mosque.

The two rotundas stood within courtyards to the north and south of the main temple. They were surrounded on all sides by stoas measuring some 5 metres (16 ft) deep, supported on the eastern side by atlantes and caryatids that each consisted of two figures standing back-to-back supporting the stoa roof. The figures were clearly intended to represent Egyptians, as they are depicted wearing Egyptian headgear.

A pair of water basins was located in front of each rotunda, measuring 11.5 metres (38 ft) long by 2.5 metres (8.2 ft) wide and 85 centimetres (33 in) deep. These basins each had a smaller round basin of 1.75 metres (5.7 ft) diameter at each end.

=== Underground ===
An underground complex lies below the temple and rotundas. Spiral ramps lead down from the rotundas to connect with a north-south passageway that links all three buildings. Branching passageways lead to secondary entrances in the temenos and to several pillared underground chambers – two on the south side have been excavated and it is presumed that a corresponding pair of chambers exist under the mosque/rotunda on the north side. The passageways gave access to the hidden entrance to the cult statue and also to the side walls of the temple, linking to shafts that connected with the temple roof.

The tunnels are all about 2 metres (6 ft 7 in) high by between 0.45 metres (1 ft 6 in) to 1.4 metres (4 ft 7 in) wide. They appear to have been generally unadorned, but some pieces of coloured stucco are reported to be visible in one area – perhaps the remainder of some kind of decoration. The chambers to which they link are substantial structures. Two are rectangular rooms on either side of the main temple, measuring 9 metres (30 ft) by 15 metres (49 ft), 4 metres (13 ft) high, supported by pillars arranged in a 3 x 3 pattern. The other two, situated on the far side of each rotunda, are significantly larger; they measure 13 metres (43 ft) by 15 metres (49 ft) with a 4 x 4 pattern of columns. The two excavated chambers beside the south rotunda are today used as storage space for the archaeological site.

== Use and purpose ==
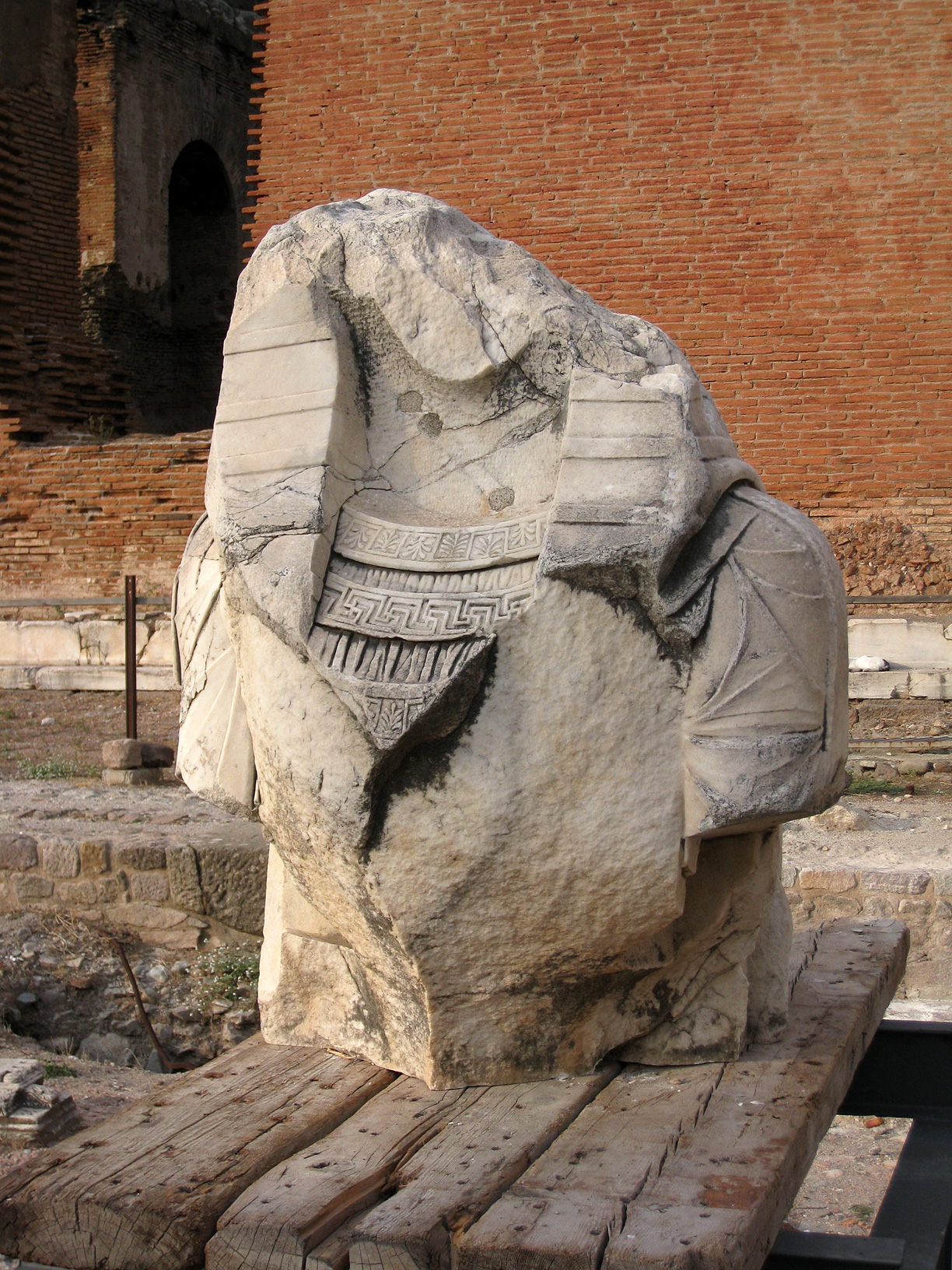
Atlantid wearing an Egyptian headdress – an indication of the nature of the gods worshipped in the temple

The temple was certainly used to worship Egyptian gods, as the presence of Egyptianised atlantids indicates. Which specific gods were worshipped there is, however, unclear. An inscription referring to the temple mentions "Serapis, Isis, Harpocrates, Osiris, Apis, Helios on a horse ... Ares and the Dioskouroi". Another inscription mentions Serapis, and a small terracotta head of Isis was discovered in the area of the temenos. One of the Oxyrhynchus Papyri from Egypt refers to Isis as ὲν Περγάμῳ δεσπότις ('she who rules in Pergamon'). The temple may well have been dedicated to Isis, though some historians have interpreted it as a Serapeum (temple of Serapis) instead. The two rotundas may have been used for the worship of Horus and Anubis.

The layout of the temple provides more clues about how it was used. Unlike Greek temples, where the entire building was considered to be the house of the divinity, the god worshipped in the "Red Basilica" was confined to the eastern half of the temple. Similar layouts are found in other Isis and Serapis temples elsewhere in Asia Minor and Greece. The temenos is a vastly enlarged equivalent of enclosures found elsewhere in Greek mystery sanctuaries, such as the one as Eleusis in Greece where the Eleusinian Mysteries were performed annually. The purpose of its high walls was to prevent outsiders from witnessing ceremonies held within the temenos and temple precinct, thus preserving the mystery of the rituals.

Water appears to have been a central theme of the ceremonies held at the temple, judging from the number of water features (basins, troughs and so on) in the complex. The basins outside the temple may have been purely decorative but those inside seem to have been intended for use in ceremonies. These may have included purification rituals – sprinkling the faithful with water – and possibly also a ritual re-enactment of the flooding of the Nile. Robert A. Wild suggests that the deep basin dividing the temple into its eastern and western halves may have been designed to convey flood- or rainwater into the temple during peak rainfall periods in the winter. The basin also served to separate the public western half of the temple from the sacred eastern half. Initiates may have been taken through the underground passages to the cultic area, where they would be presented to the worshippers filling the western end of the temple. Something of this nature is hinted at by Apuleius in Metamorphoses: "There in the middle of this sacred temple before the image of the goddess I was made to stand on a wooden pulpit."

== Bibliography ==
- Gates, Charles (2003). Ancient cities: the archaeology of urban life in the Ancient Near East and Egypt, Greece and Rome. London: Routledge. ISBN 978-0-415-01895-1.
- Jonsson, David W. (2007). The Clash of Ideologies. Longwood, FL: Xulon Press. ISBN 978-1-59781-039-5.
- Koester, Helmut (2007). Paul & his world: interpreting the New Testament in its context. Minneapolis: Fortress Press. ISBN 978-0-8006-3890-0.
- Wild, Robert A. (1981). Water in the cultic worship of Isis and Sarapis. Leiden: Brill Archive. ISBN 978-90-04-06331-0.
- Witt, Reginald Eldred (1997). Isis in the ancient world. JHU Press. ISBN 978-0-8018-5642-6.
- The Southern Rotunda (Plaque at location). Kızıl Avlu, Bergama, Turkey: German Archaeological Institute.
- "Pergamon: The city and its landscape". German Archaeological Institute. 2009-06-04. Archived from the original on 2010-12-05.
- "Pergamon, the Red Hall". German Archaeological Institute. 2009-02-24. Archived from the original on 2009-11-20.
