= Nysa Bridge =

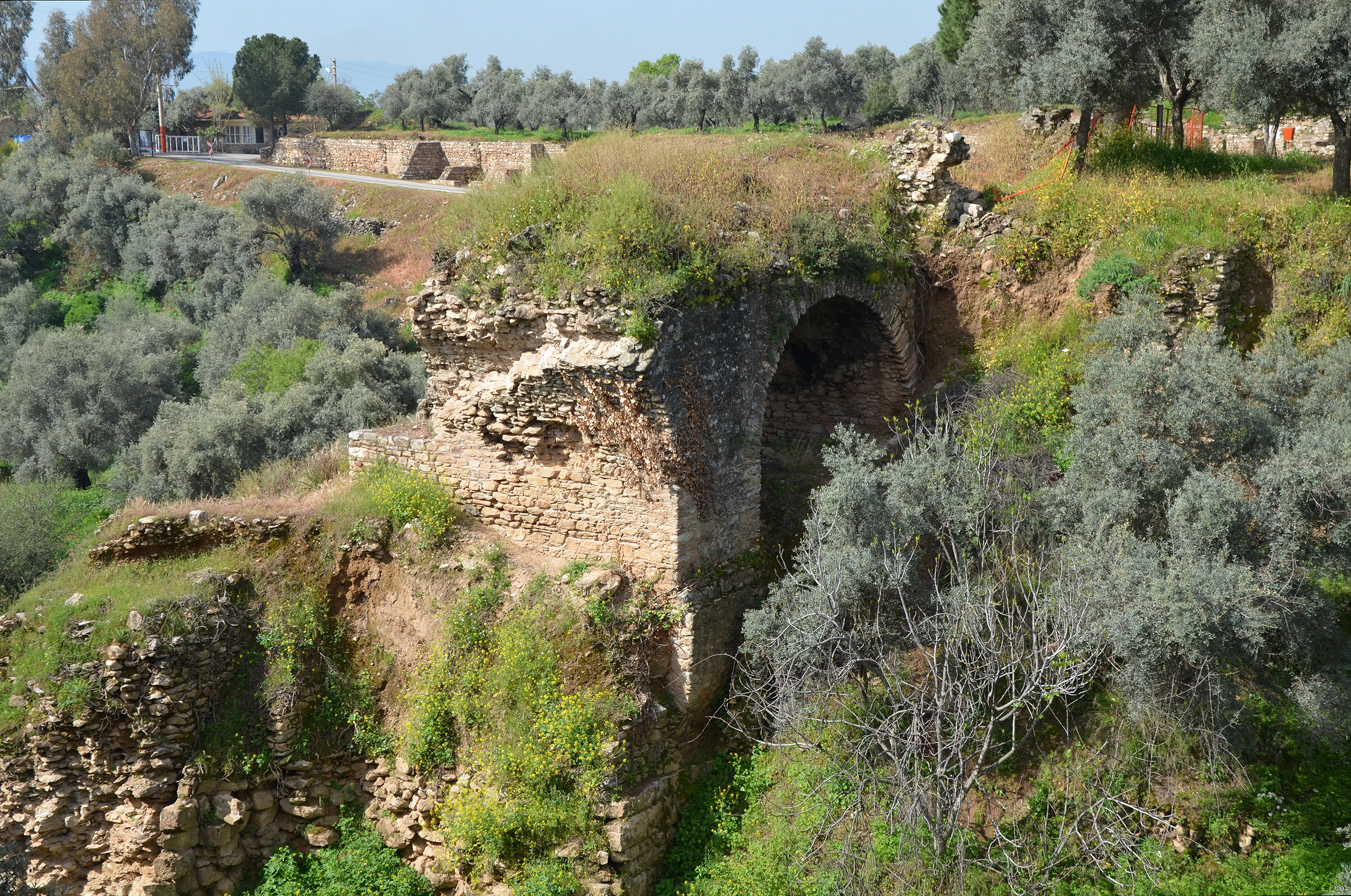
- Coordinates: 37.903405°N 28.145514°E
- Carries: Substructure for theatre square
- Crosses: Cakircak
- Locale: Nysa (Sultanhisar), Caria, Turkey

Characteristics
- Design: Arch bridge
- Material: Stone
- Width: c. 100 m
- Longest span: 5.7–7 m
- No. of spans: 1 (bottom vault)
- Clearance below: 5.9 m

The Nysa Bridge is a late imperial Roman bridge over the Cakircak stream in Nysa (modern Sultanhisar) in the ancient region of Caria, modern-day Turkey. The 100 m (328 ft) long substructure was the second largest of its kind in antiquity, after the Pergamon Bridge.

== Dating ==
The Greek geographer Strabo (63 BC–AD 21), who lived in Nysa, mentioned a secret water conduit in the town, but it remains unclear whether he meant the existing tunnel-like bridge. An inscription at the northern wall of the tube, close to a bend after 25 m (82 ft), indicates a construction date in late imperial times. It reads "Work of Praülos until this point".

== Construction ==
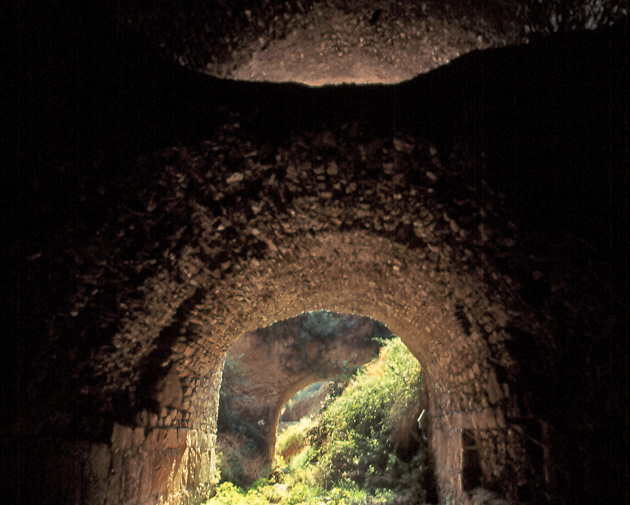
Inside view of the "tunnel" downstream. The section in sunlight has collapsed, leaving two separate arches. The vault of the second-level arcade appears at the upper rim of the photo.

The Nysa Bridge served as a substructure for the area in front of the city theatre, which lay close to the Cakircak stream. It was built as a two-level structure: the bottom vault spanned the brook. On top of it a row of arches connected the two hills that formed the urban area. The ground arch spanned the stream on a length of some 100 m (328 ft), giving the bridge the appearance of a tube or a tunnel, although it was constructed entirely above ground. It consists of a single, 5.7 m (19 ft) wide vault whose uphill mouth widens to 7 m (23 ft). The overall height of its semi-circular arch is 5.9 m (19 ft), featuring a rise of 2.95 m (9 ft 8 in). The vault is made of rubble stone laid in mortar, resting on a substructure of ashlar stone blocks of varying size (0.3–0.9 x 1.0–1.4 m). Originally featuring a continuous vaulting, it is collapsed today between m 75 and 85, and again at the downhill exit. The remaining, isolated structure at the downstream side has often been incorrectly referred to as a bridge of its own. The Nysa Bridge was the second largest bridge substruction of its kind in antiquity, only surpassed by the nearby Pergamon Bridge. By comparison, the width of a normal, free standing Roman bridge did not exceed 10 m (33 ft).

In its further course, the Cakircak also ran through the city stadion, so that naumachia could be given. There are remains of two other ancient bridges both up- and downstream.

== Discharge capacity ==
The capacity limit of the Nysa Bridge in case of floods has been the subject of hydraulic and hydrological research. The gradient of the tunnel was calculated as 3.3% with a maximum discharge capacity of 290 m³/s. Exceeding this limit puts the bridge under internal pressure and damages the structure in the process. Considering that the Cakircak is 6 km (3.7 mi) long, with a median gradient of 19% and a drainage basin of 4 km^{2} (1.5 sq mi), the following median intervals were calculated, depending on the method employed:

- 7,500 years (Günerman method)
- 10,500 years (D.S.I. method)
- 13,000 years (Mockus method)
- 68,000 years (Snyder method)

The study came to the conclusion that statistically every 13,500 years, a value which has been referred to as the "arithmetic mean", floods are to be expected which would exceed the capacity of the bridge.

== See also ==
- List of Roman bridges
- Roman architecture
- Roman engineering

== Sources ==
- Grewe, Klaus; Özis, Ünal (1994), "Die antiken Flußüberbauungen von Pergamon und Nysa (Türkei)", Antike Welt, 25 (4): 348–352
- O’Connor, Colin (1993), Roman Bridges, Cambridge University Press, ISBN 0-521-39326-4
