= Serapeum =

Temple dedicated to Serapis

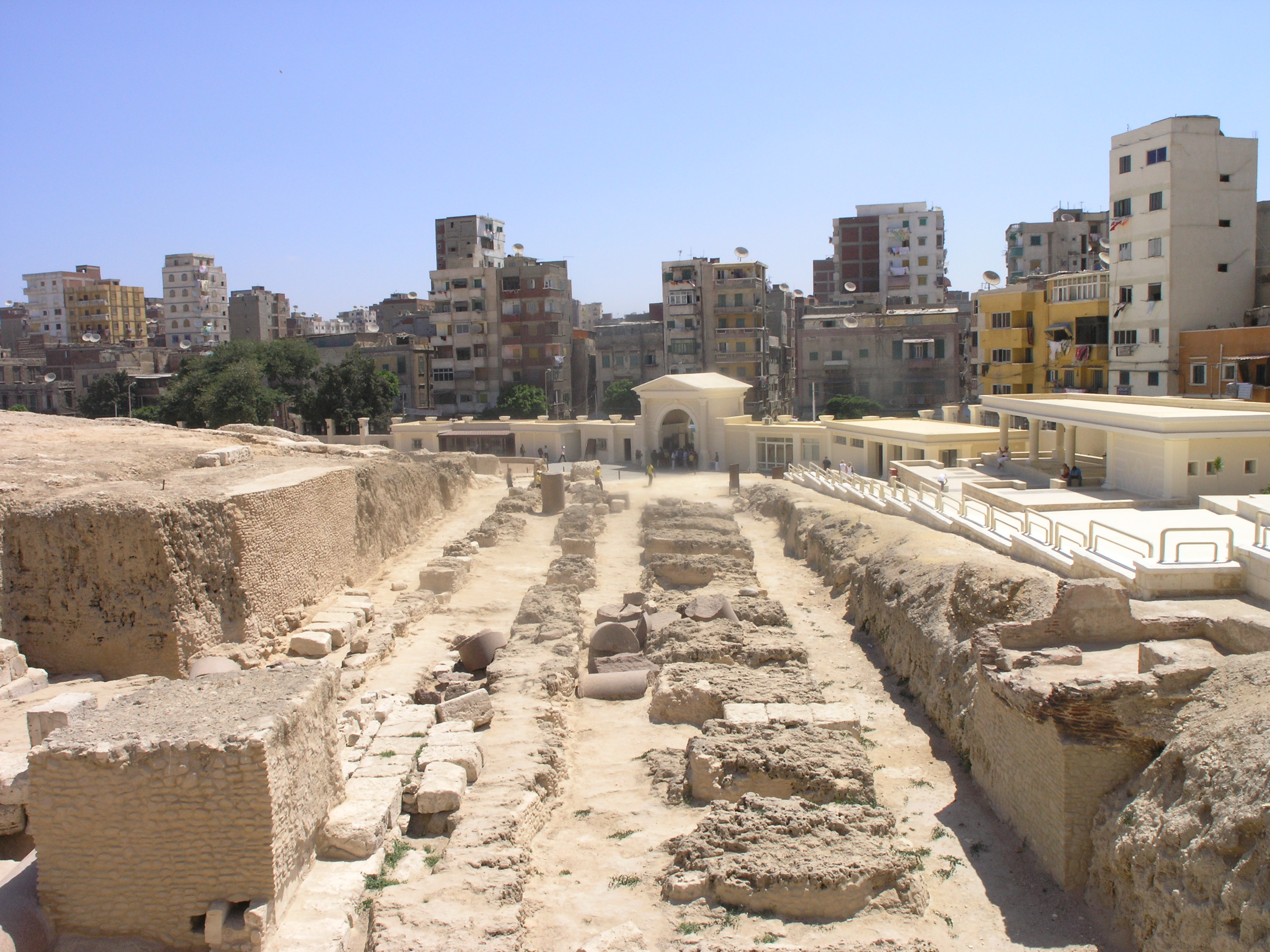
Remains of the Serapeum of Alexandria

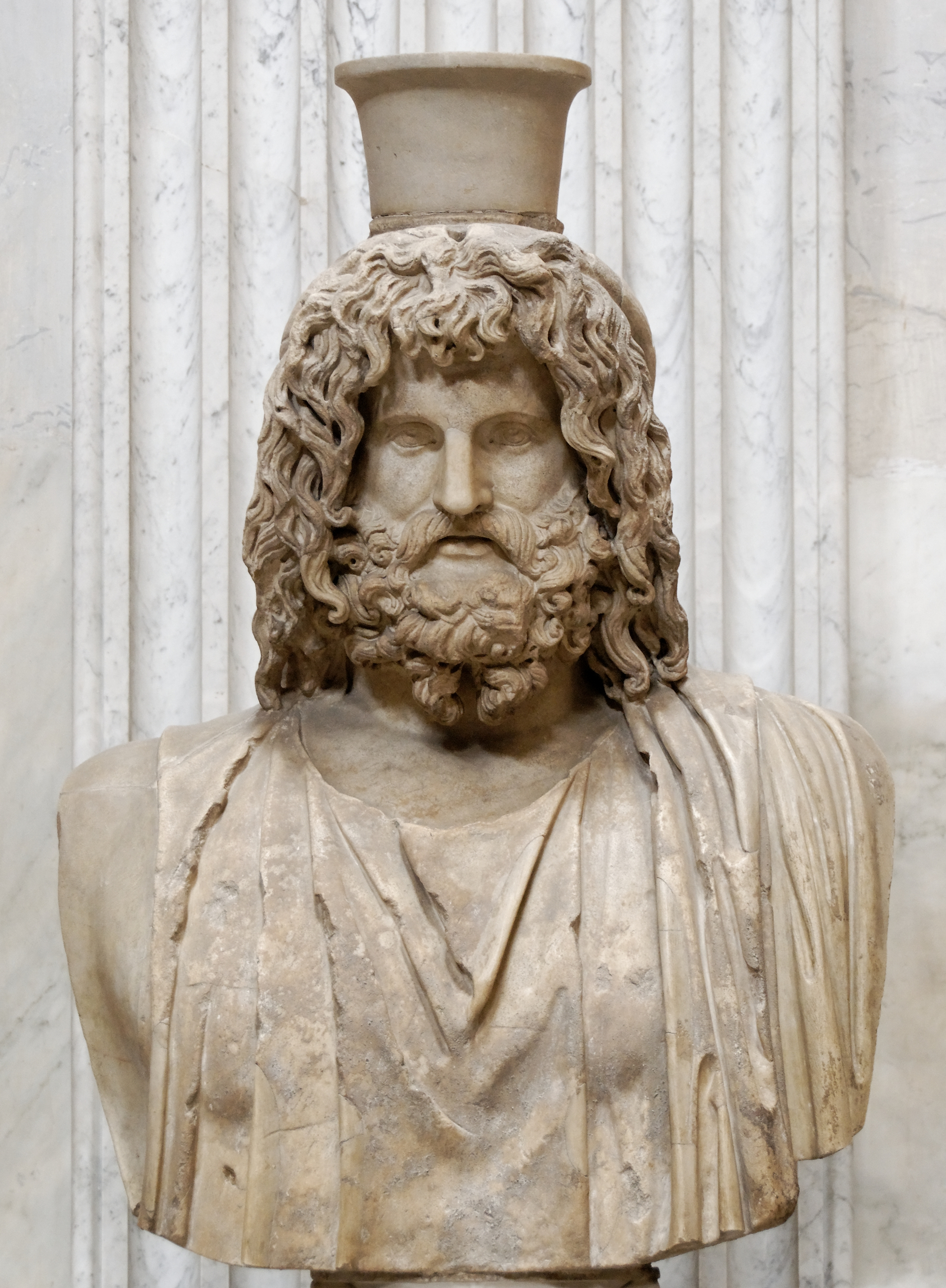
Marble bust of Serapis, Roman copy after a Greek original from the 4th century BC

A serapeum is a temple or other religious institution dedicated to the syncretic Greco-Egyptian deity Serapis, who combined aspects of Osiris and Apis in a humanized form that was accepted by the Ptolemaic Greeks of Alexandria. There were several such religious centers, each of which was called a serapeion/serapeum (Ancient Greek: Σεραπεῖον) or poserapi (Ancient Greek: Ποσεραπι), coming from an Egyptian name for the temple of Osiris-Apis (Ancient Egyptian: pr-Wsỉr-Ḥp, lit. 'house of Osiris-Apis'). These religious sites show the clear extent and influence of the Ptolemaic Kingdom, especially throughout the Mediterranean Sea.

== Egyptian serapea ==
=== Alexandria ===
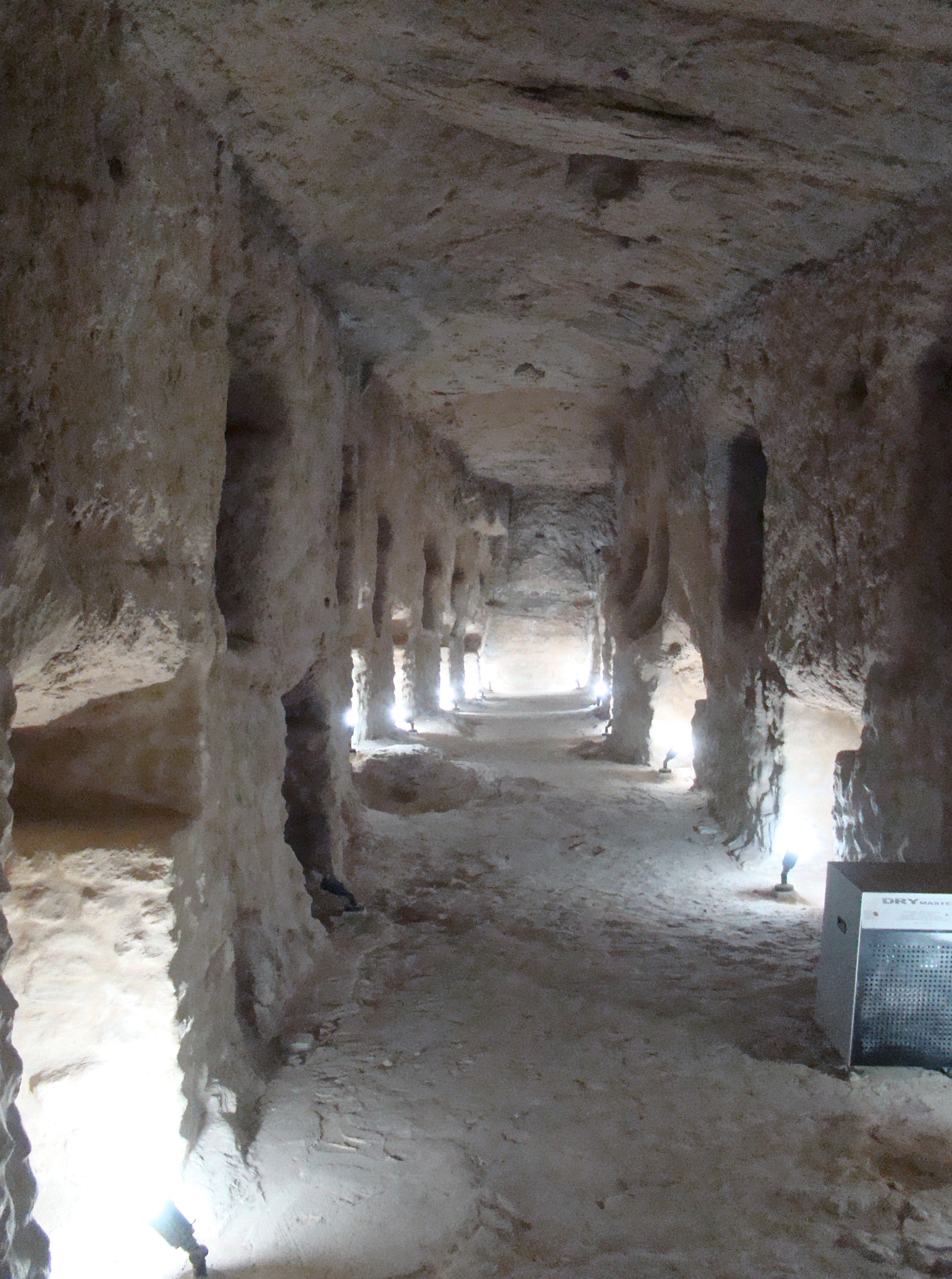
The Catacombs beneath the Serapeum of Alexandria

The Serapeum of Alexandria in the Ptolemaic Kingdom was an ancient Greek temple built by Ptolemy III Euergetes. There are also signs of Harpocrates. It has been referred to as the daughter of the Library of Alexandria. It existed until the end of the fourth century AD.

=== Saqqara ===
The Serapeum of Saqqara is located north west of the Pyramid of Djoser at Saqqara, a necropolis near Memphis in Lower Egypt. It was a burial place of the Apis, sacred bulls that were incarnations of Ptah. It was believed that the bulls became immortal after death as Osiris-Apis, a name shortened to Serapis in the Hellenic period.

=== Canopus ===
Another serapeum was located at Canopus, in the Nile Delta near Alexandria. This sanctuary, dedicated to Isis and her consort Serapis, became one of the most famous cult centers of the Ptolemaic Kingdom and Roman Egypt. Its festivals and rites were so popular that the site became an architectural model for sanctuaries to the Egyptian gods throughout the Roman Empire.

At this Graeco-Roman site, a sacred temenos enclosed the temple dedicated to the gods, which was located behind a propylaea or peristyle court. Auxiliary shrines dedicated to other, less universal, Egyptian deities could be found here as well, including those dedicated to Anubis (Hermanubis), Hermes Trismegistus, the syncretism of Thoth and Hermes, Harpocrates, and others. Ritual complexes dedicated to Isis were often built around a well or a spring, which was meant to represent the miraculous annual inundation of the Nile. This was also the case in sanctuaries devoted to the Egyptian gods in Roman-era Delos, where a central basin provided the water element central in the rites of Isis.

== Serapea in Italy ==
=== Regio tertia ===
The Regio III within the city of Rome was named Isis et Serapis because it contained a temple dedicated to the two Egyptian deities. The structure, originally dedicated to Isis alone, was built by Quintus Caecilius Metellus Pius in the first half of the 1st century BCE to celebrate his father's victory over Jugurtha.

The complex, of which only parts of the foundations remain, was originally terraced; during the Flavian dynasty, it underwent major renovations, and the cult of Serapis was associated to that of Isis. The temple was finally demolished during the 6th century.

=== Campus Martius ===
This temple, dedicated to Isis and Serapis, was first dedicated by the triumvirs in 43 BCE in Rome. However, due to later tensions between Octavian (later Augustus Caesar) and Marc Antony, the temple was not built. Following the Battle at Actium, Augustus banned the religion from within the pomerium of Rome altogether. The temple was finally built by Gaius Caligula on the area known as Campus Martius, between the Saepta Julia and the temple of Minerva c. 37–41 CE.

The Serapeum, 240 m (790 ft) long and 60 m (200 ft) wide, was divided in three sections: a rectangular area could be accessed first by walking under monumental arches; an open square, adorned with red granite obelisks brought to the city during the 1st century and erected in couples, followed. The centre of the square was likely occupied by the temple dedicated to Isis, while the third section, a semicircular exedra with an apse presumably hosted the altar dedicated to Serapis. Fragments of the obelisks, some quite large, have been found around the current church of Santa Maria sopra Minerva; some archaeologists have proposed that the obelisk facing the Pantheon (see picture) may have been repositioned from the temple to its current location.

The building was destroyed in the great fire of the year 80 CE and rebuilt by Domitian; further renovation was initiated by Hadrian, while Septimius Severus ordered the necessary upkeep of the temple's structure. Written records attest to the Serapeum's existence and ritual activity until the 5th century.

=== Quirinal Hill ===
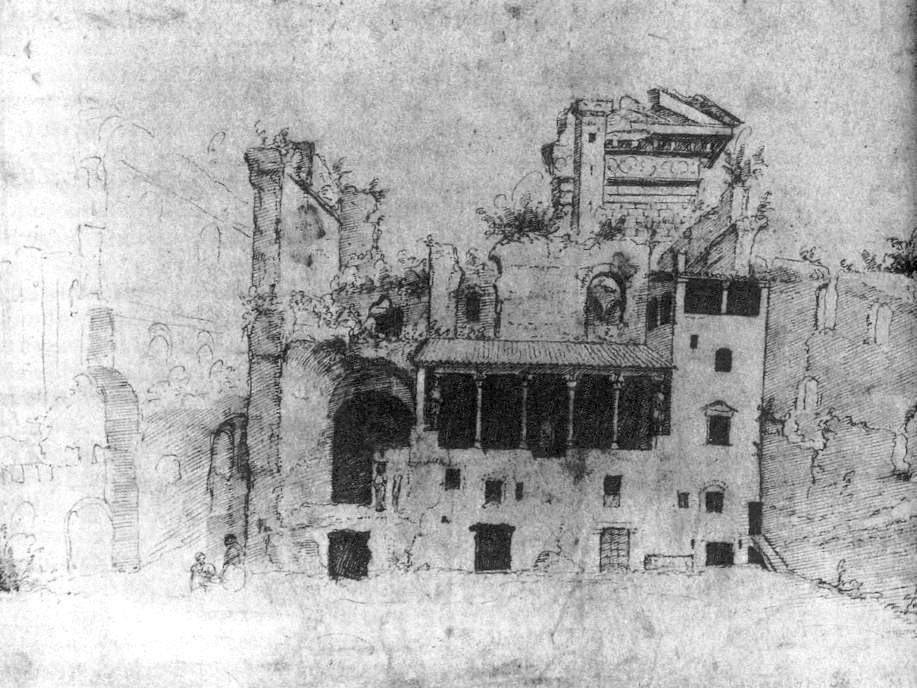
Sketch of Palazzo Colonna (1534–1536) by Marten van Heemskerck showing the remains of the ancient Temple of Serapis.

The temple built on Quirinal Hill and dedicated to Serapis was, by most surviving accounts, the most sumptuous and architectonically ambitious of those built on the hill; its remains are still visible between Palazzo Colonna and the Pontifical Gregorian University.

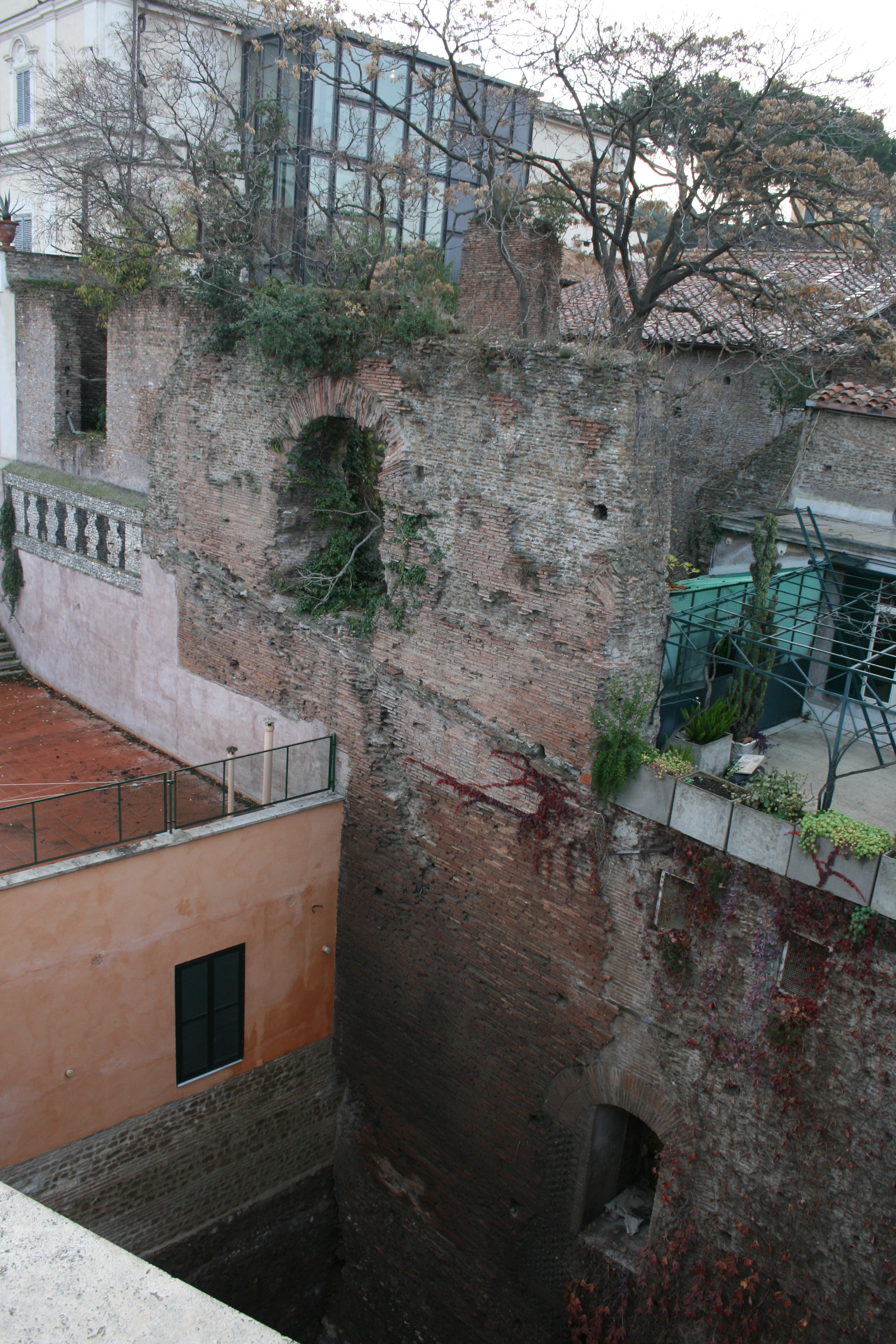
Remains of the ancient Temple on the Quirinal hillside.

The sanctuary, which lay between today's piazza della Pilotta and the large square facing Quirinal Palace, was built by Caracalla on the western slopes of the hill, covering over 13,000 m^{2} (3.2 acres), as its sides measured 135 by 98 m (443 by 322 ft). It was composed by a long courtyard (surrounded by a colonnade) and by the ritual area, where statues and obelisks had been erected. Designed to impress its visitors, the temple boasted columns 21.17 m (69 ft 5 in) tall and 2 m (6 ft 7 in) in diameter, visually sitting atop a marble stairway that connected the base of the hill to the sanctuary.

An enormous fragment of entablature, weighing approximately 100 tons and 34 m^{3} (1,200 cu ft) in volume (the largest in Rome), belongs to the original temple, as do the statues of the Nile and the Tiber, moved by Michelangelo to the Capitoline Hill in front of the Senate building.

=== Hadrian's Villa ===
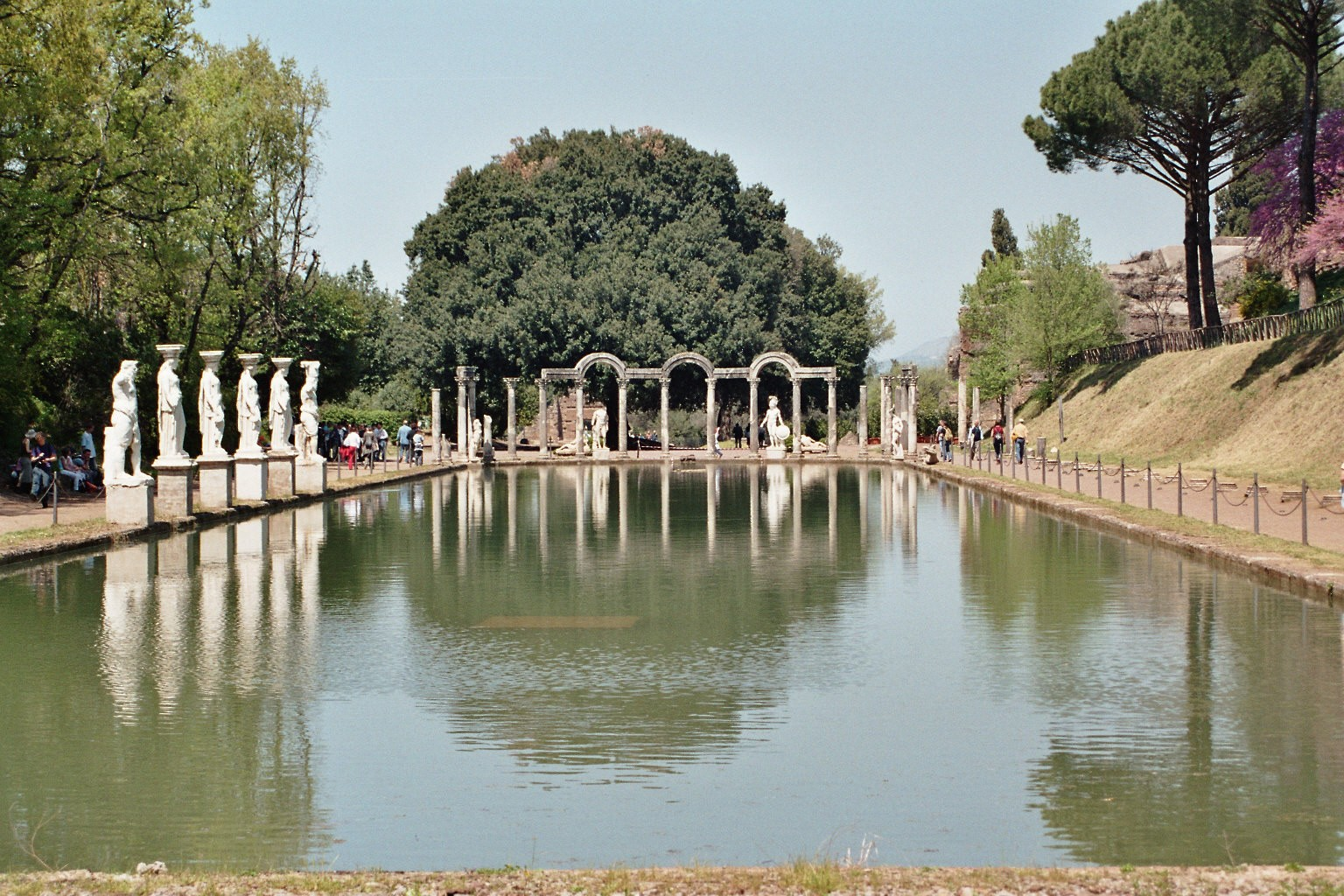
The canopus pool of Hadrian's Villa in Tivoli, Lazio.

Emperor Hadrian (117–138) ordered the construction of a "canopus" in his villa in Tivoli with typical imperial grandeur: an immense rectangular tank representing a canal, 119 m (390 ft) long by 18 m (59 ft) wide was surrounded by porticoes and statues, leading the way to a Serapeum. Protected by a monumental dome, the sanctuary was composed of a public area and a more intimate subterranean part that was dedicated to the chthonic aspect of Serapis.

To mark the inauguration of his temple, Hadrian struck coinage that carry his effigy accompanied by Serapis, upon a dais where two columns support a round canopy. In this manner, the emperor became synnaos, a companion of the god's arcane naos and equal beneficiary of the cult of Serapis at Canopus.

In February 2021, archaeologists led by researcher Rafael Hidalgo Prieto from the Pablo de Olavide University announced the discovery of remains of Hadrian's breakfast room which used to show his imperial power. They revealed a structure as a water triclinium and a separate dining room that served as a model for the well-known Serapeum in his villa.

=== Ostia Antica ===
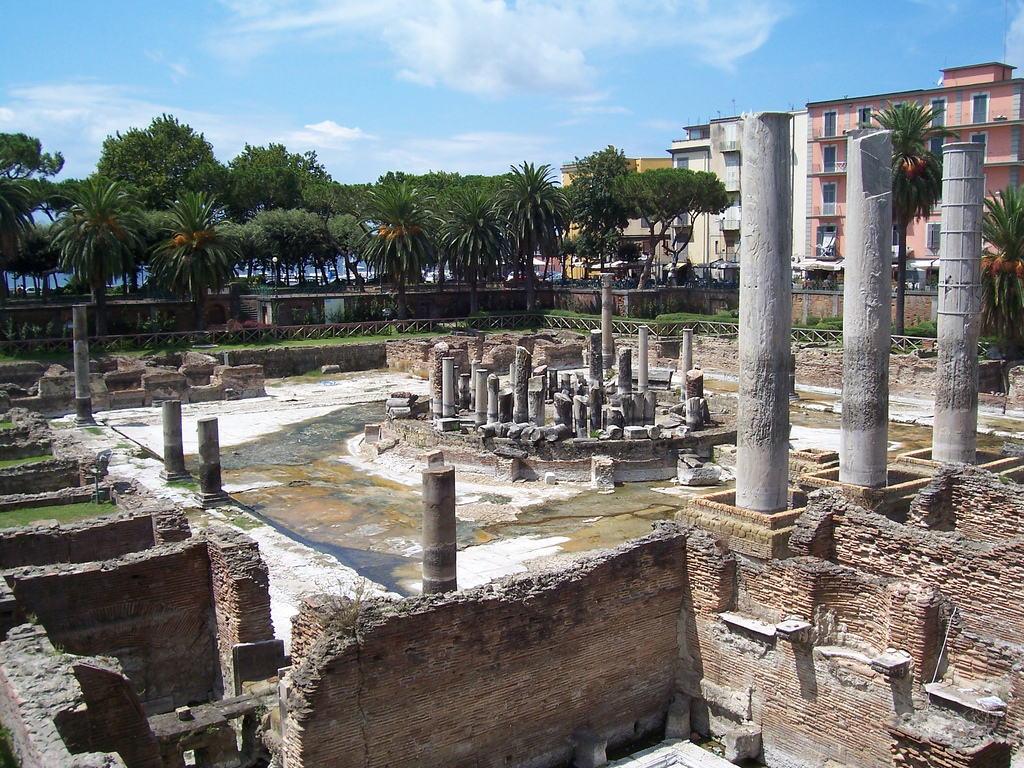
The ancient Macellum of Pozzuoli was a market building, erroneously identified as a Serapeum when a statue of Serapis was discovered.

The Serapeum of Ostia Antica was inaugurated in 127 CE and dedicated to the syncretic cult of Jupiter Serapis.

It is a typical Roman sanctuary, on a raised platform and with a row of columns at the entrance, where a mosaic representing Apis in a typically Egyptian manner can still be seen. From this temple likely came the statue that Bryaxis copied for the Serapeum in Alexandria.

=== Pozzuoli ===
The Macellum of Pozzuoli, marketplace or macellum of the Roman city of Puteoli (now known as Pozzuoli) was first excavated in the 18th century, when the discovery of a statue of Serapis led to the building being misidentified as the city's serapeum, the Temple of Serapis. Under that name, the site had considerable influence on early geology as a band of boreholes affecting the three standing columns suggested that the building had been partly below sea level for some period.

== Serapea in Tunisia ==
A Latin inscription and other archaeological finds including statues, busts and other objects indicating the presence of a Serapeum from the Roman period in Carthage, dedicated to the Egyptian deities Isis and Serapis.

== Serapea in Turkey ==
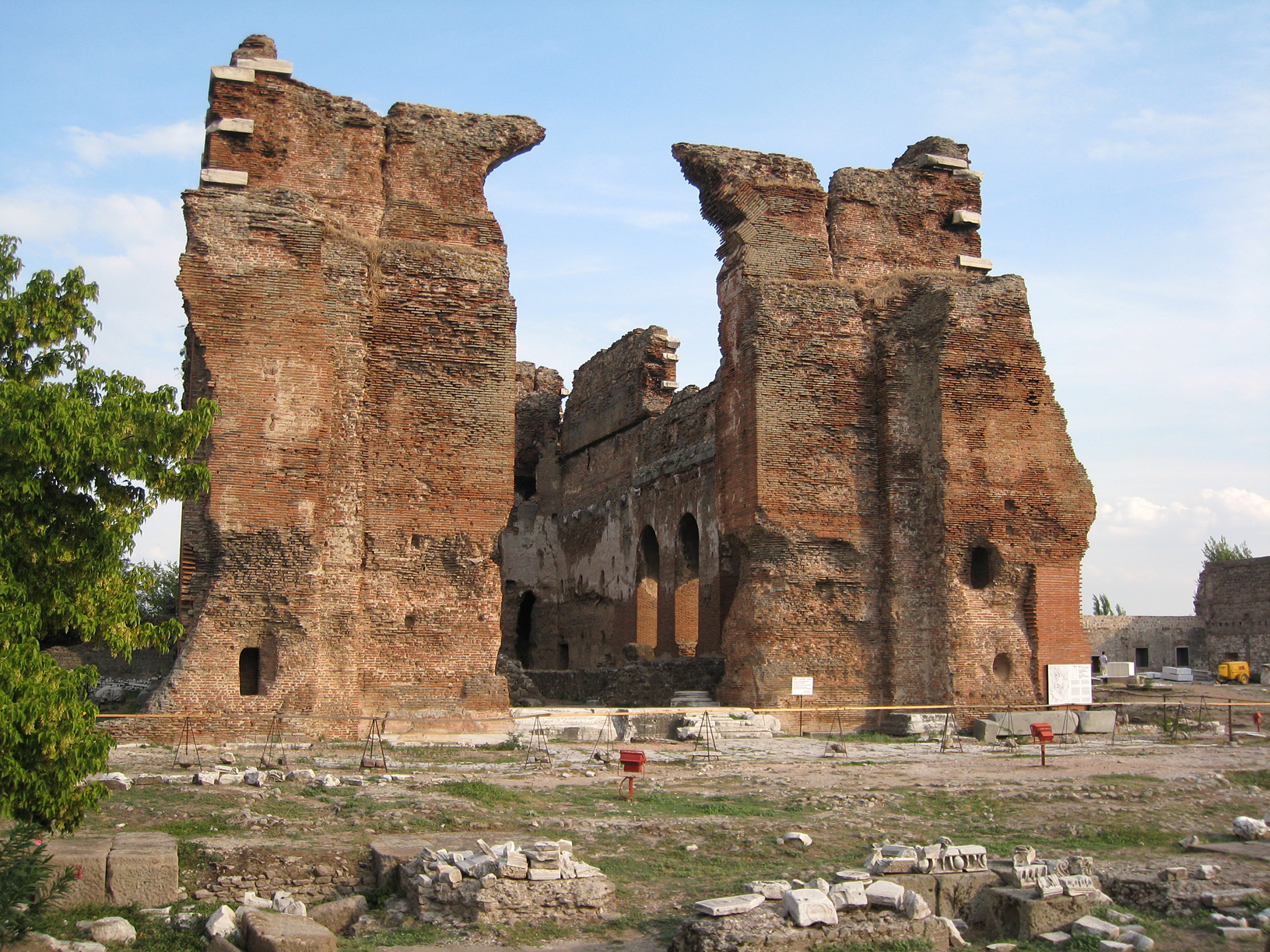
The Red Basilica, one of the seven important churches in Early Christianity, was built on the temple of Serapis, Bergama.

=== Pergamon ===
Inside Pergamon in Bergama, there is the Temple of Serapis, built for the Egyptian gods in the 2nd century CE and called the Red Basilica (Kızıl Avlu in Turkish) by locals. This is a basilica-shaped building constructed under the reign of Hadrian. It consists of a main building and two round towers. In the Christian New Testament, the Church at Pergamon, inside the main building of the Red Basilica, is listed as one of the Seven Churches to which the Book of Revelation was addressed (Revelation 2:12).

=== Ephesus ===
Another serapeum was in Ephesus, which is near present-day Selçuk, İzmir Province, Turkey. The temple is located behind the Library of Celsus. This Egyptian temple was turned into a Christian church.

=== Miletus ===
This temple was built in the 3rd century BCE near the south agora of Miletus and also it was restored by Emperor Julius Aurelius (270–275 CE).
