= Roman brick =

Style of brick used in Ancient Roman architecture

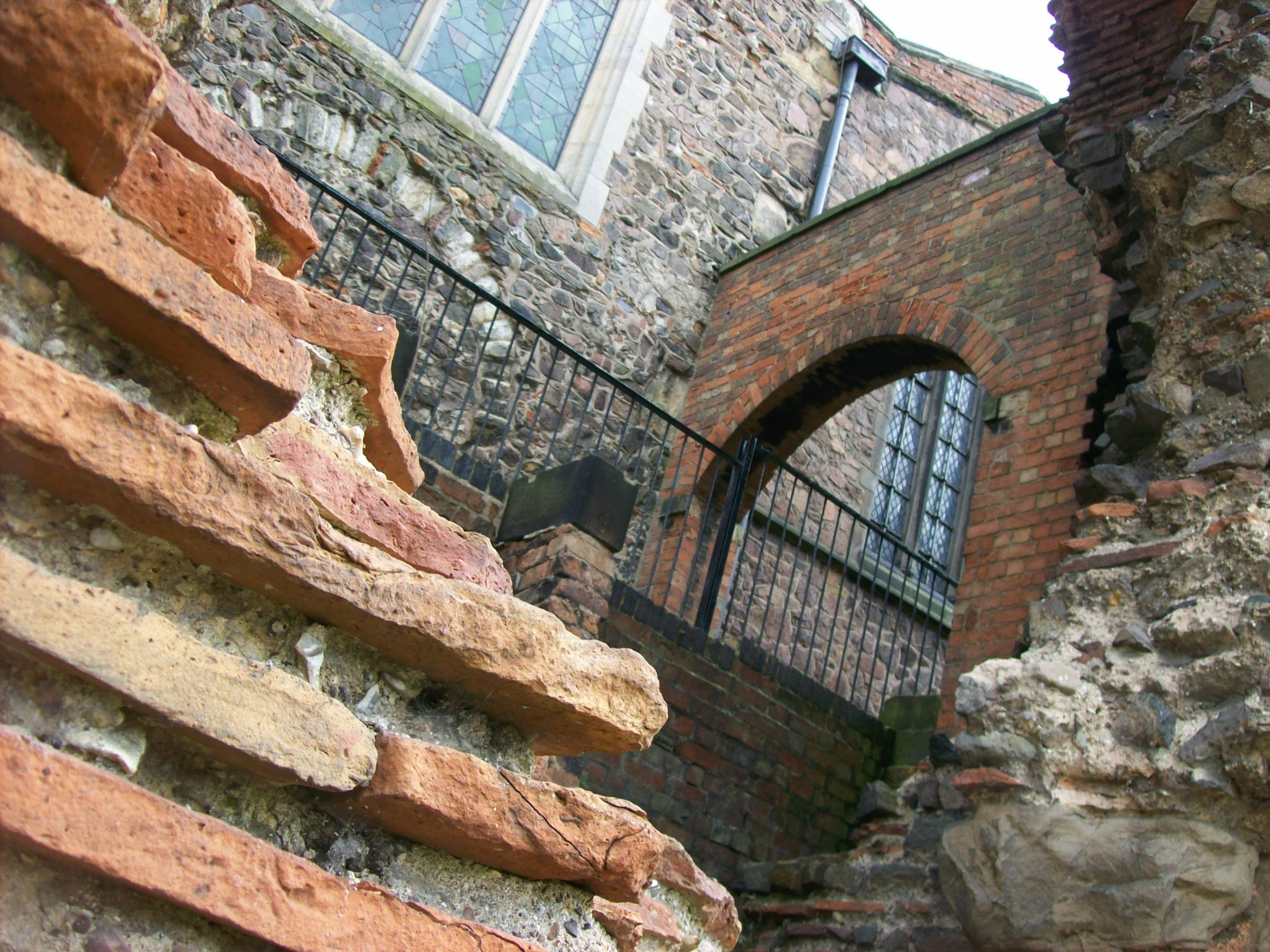
Roman bricks in the Jewry Wall, Leicester. The 20th-century bracing arch in the background utilises modern bricks.

Roman brick is a type of brick used in ancient Roman architecture and spread by the Romans to the lands they conquered, or a modern adaptation inspired by the ancient prototypes. Both types are characteristically longer and flatter than standard modern bricks.

== History ==
=== Ancient ===
The Romans only developed fired clay bricks under the Empire, but had previously used mudbrick, dried only by the sun and therefore much weaker and only suitable for smaller buildings. Development began under Augustus, using techniques developed by the Greeks, who had been using fired bricks much longer, and the earliest dated building in Rome to make use of fired brick is the Theatre of Marcellus, completed in 13 BC. The process of drying bricks in a kiln prevented them from cracking when they dried. The mudbrick took a very long time to dry and limited brick creation to certain seasons. The fired bricks allowed brick production to greatly increase, generating mass production of bricks in Rome.

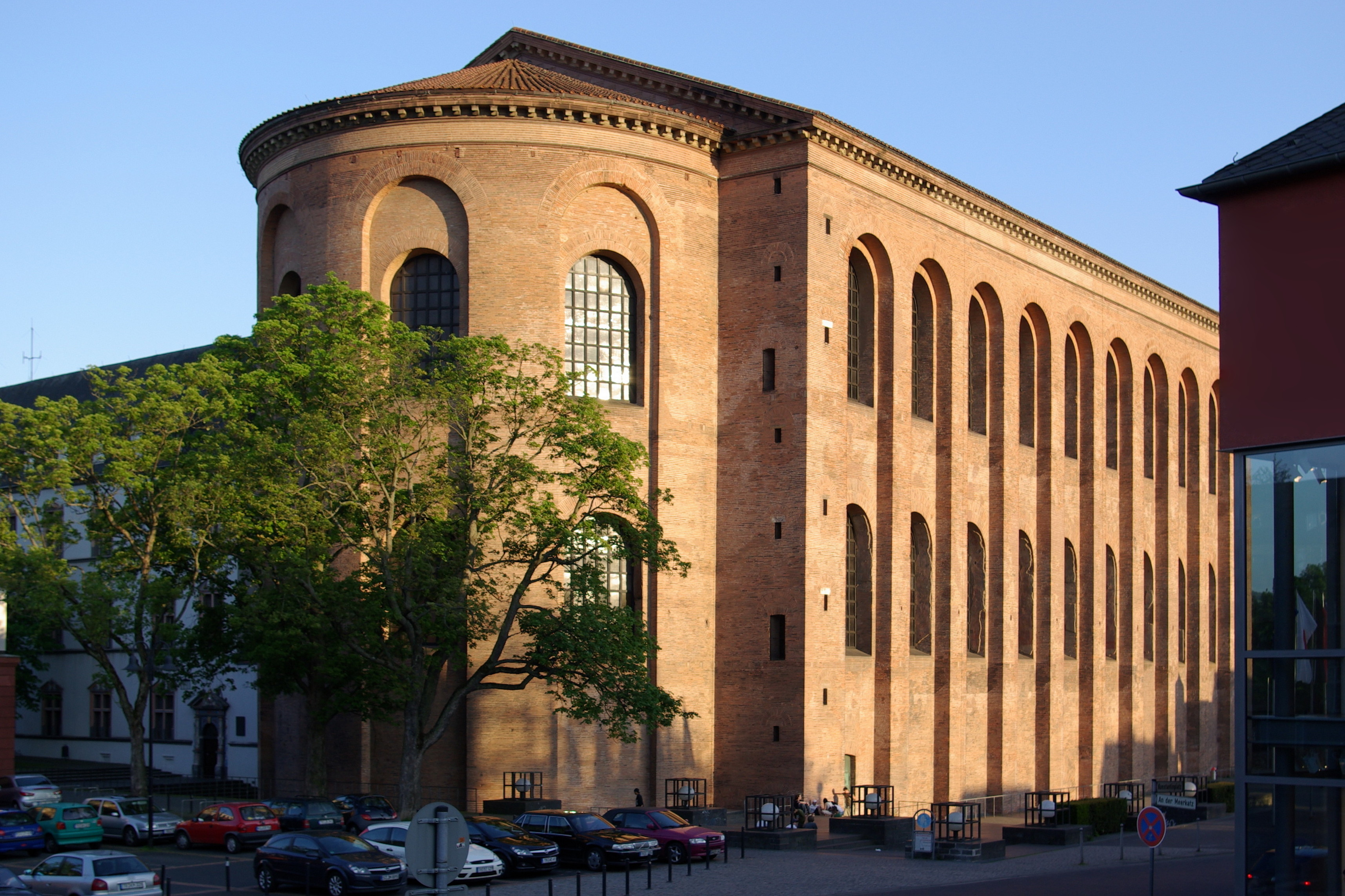
The Constantine Basilica in Trier, built in Roman brick

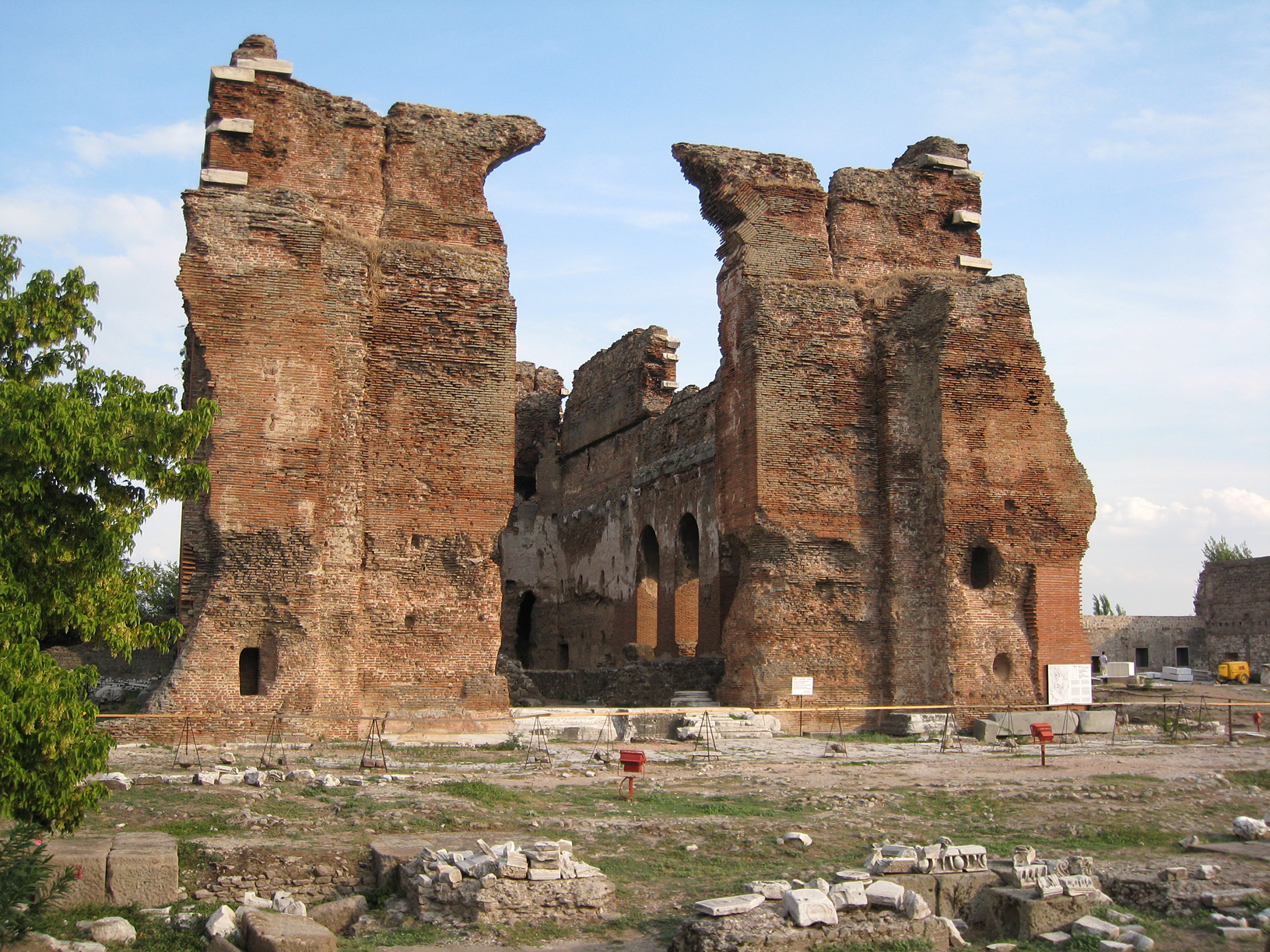
The Red Basilica at Pergamon, built using Roman brick

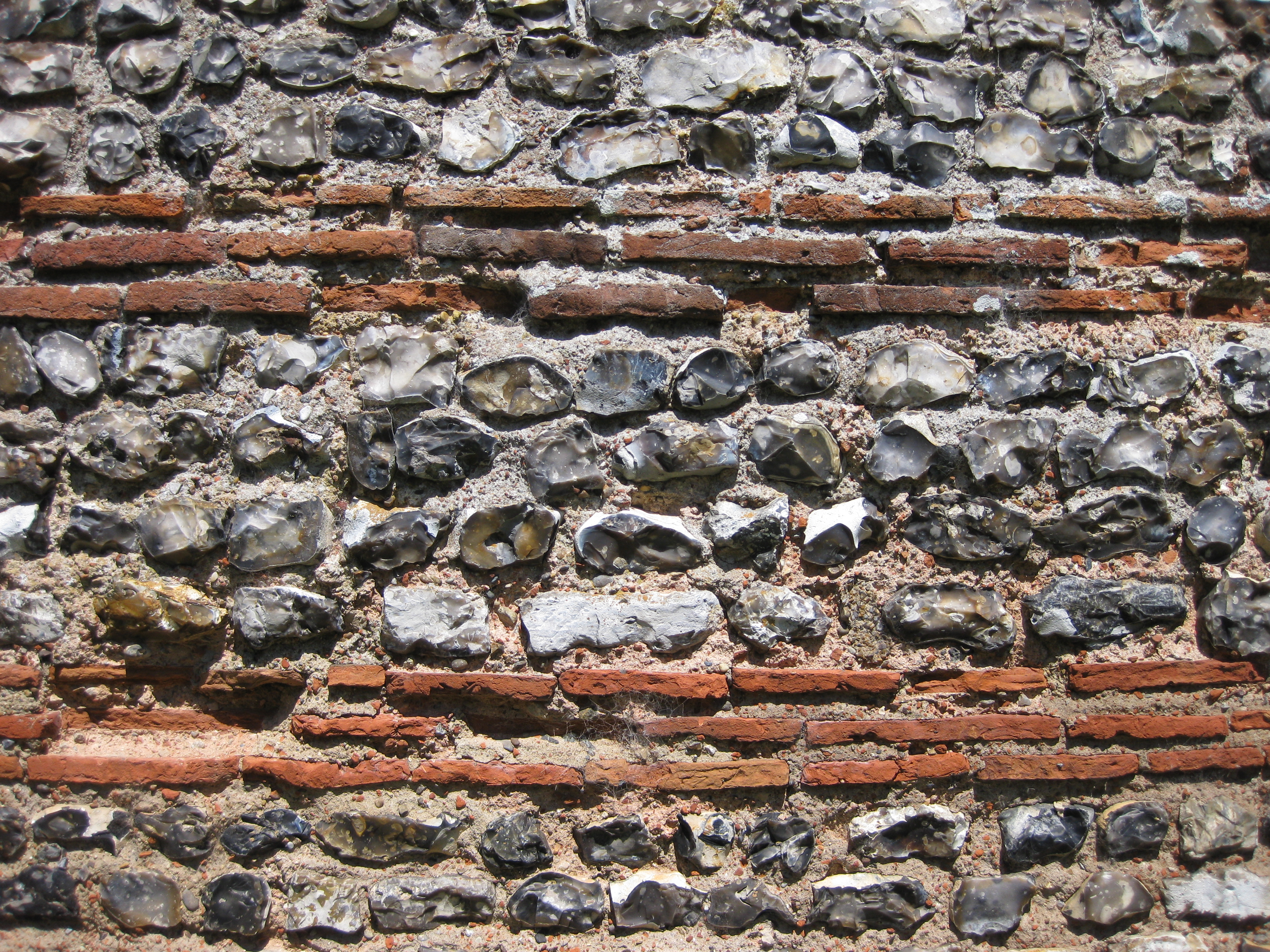
Wall of the Roman shore fort at Burgh Castle, Norfolk, with alternating courses of flint and brickwork

Roman brick was almost invariably of a lesser height than modern brick, but was made in a variety of different shapes and sizes. Shapes included square, rectangular, triangular and round, and the largest bricks found have measured over three feet in length. Ancient Roman bricks had a general size of 1½ Roman feet by 1 Roman foot, but common variations up to 15 inches existed. Other brick sizes in Ancient Rome included 24" x 12" x 4", and 15" x 8" x 10". Ancient Roman bricks found in France measured 8" x 8" x 3". The Constantine Basilica in Trier is constructed from Roman bricks 15" square by 1½" thick. There is often little obvious difference (particularly when only fragments survive) between Roman bricks used for walls on the one hand, and tiles used for roofing or flooring on the other, so archaeologists sometimes prefer to use the generic term Ceramic Building Material (or CBM).

The Romans perfected brick-making during the first century of their Empire and used it ubiquitously, in public and private construction alike. The mass production of Roman bricks led to an increase in public building projects. Over time the public and private relationship diminished as the brick business turned into an imperial monopoly. The Romans took their brickmaking skills everywhere they went, introducing the craft to the local populations. The Roman legions operated mobile kilns and introduced bricks to many parts of the empire. The bricks became time records and geographical pinpoints to where the Roman military was operating. Roman bricks are often stamped with the mark of the legion that supervised their production. Roman brick was used to construct famous architecture such as the Red Basilica in Pergamon, Domus Tiberiana and the Basilica of Maxentius in Rome. The use of bricks in southern and western Germany, for example, can be traced back to traditions already described by the Roman architect Vitruvius, although he probably refers to mud brick. In the British Isles, the introduction of Roman brick by the Ancient Romans was followed by a 600–700 year gap in major brick production.

When building in masonry, the Romans often interspersed the stonework at set intervals with thin courses of bricks, sometimes known as "bonding tiles". This was done in order to give the structure added stability, and was particularly valuable when building with irregularly shaped building materials such as flint as the bricks would help level up the bed. The practice also had a secondary aesthetic effect of giving a polychromatic appearance to the walls.

In the 1530s, the English antiquary John Leland successfully identified Roman bricks (albeit under the misleading designation of "Briton brykes") at several geographically dispersed sites, distinguishing them by size and shape from their medieval and modern counterparts. This has been described as one of the earliest exercises in archaeological typology.

=== Medieval ===
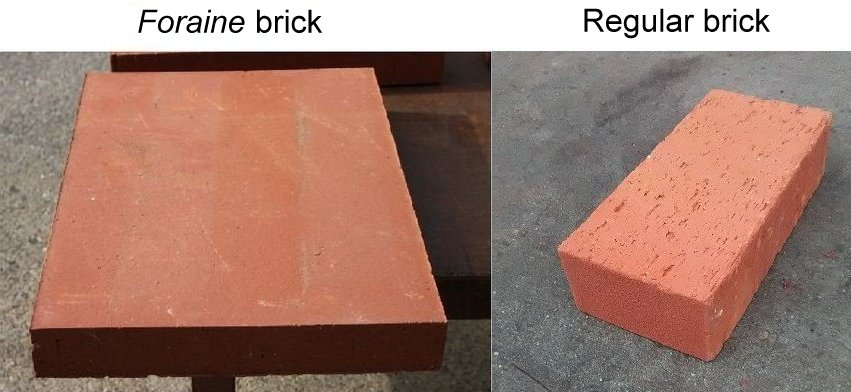
The Foraine brick is a medieval heir of the Roman brick in the region of Toulouse (France), still used nowadays.

After the Fall of the Western Roman Empire in the 5th century, many of the commercial stone quarries in Europe were abandoned. This led to a consistent pattern of the reuse of Roman building materials throughout the next several hundred years. Like much of the Roman stone, Roman bricks were gathered for reuse during this period. For example, in the 10th century, the abbots of St. Albans gathered enough Roman brick to have their own stockpile of the building material.

When brick production resumed in earnest in the British Isles, the 1½" to 2" height of the Roman-style brick gradually increased during the early Medieval period. Brick from the ancient Roman Empire was commonly reused in medieval Europe as well as in later periods. This reuse can be found across the former Roman Empire. In Great Britain, where construction materials are less plentiful, Roman structures were quarried for their stone and brick for reuse. Examples of this type of reuse in Great Britain can be found in Anglo-Saxon churches at Brixworth, Corbridge, St Martin's, Canterbury, and St Nicholas', Leicester, and also in St Albans Abbey church (now St Albans Cathedral).

== Modern ==
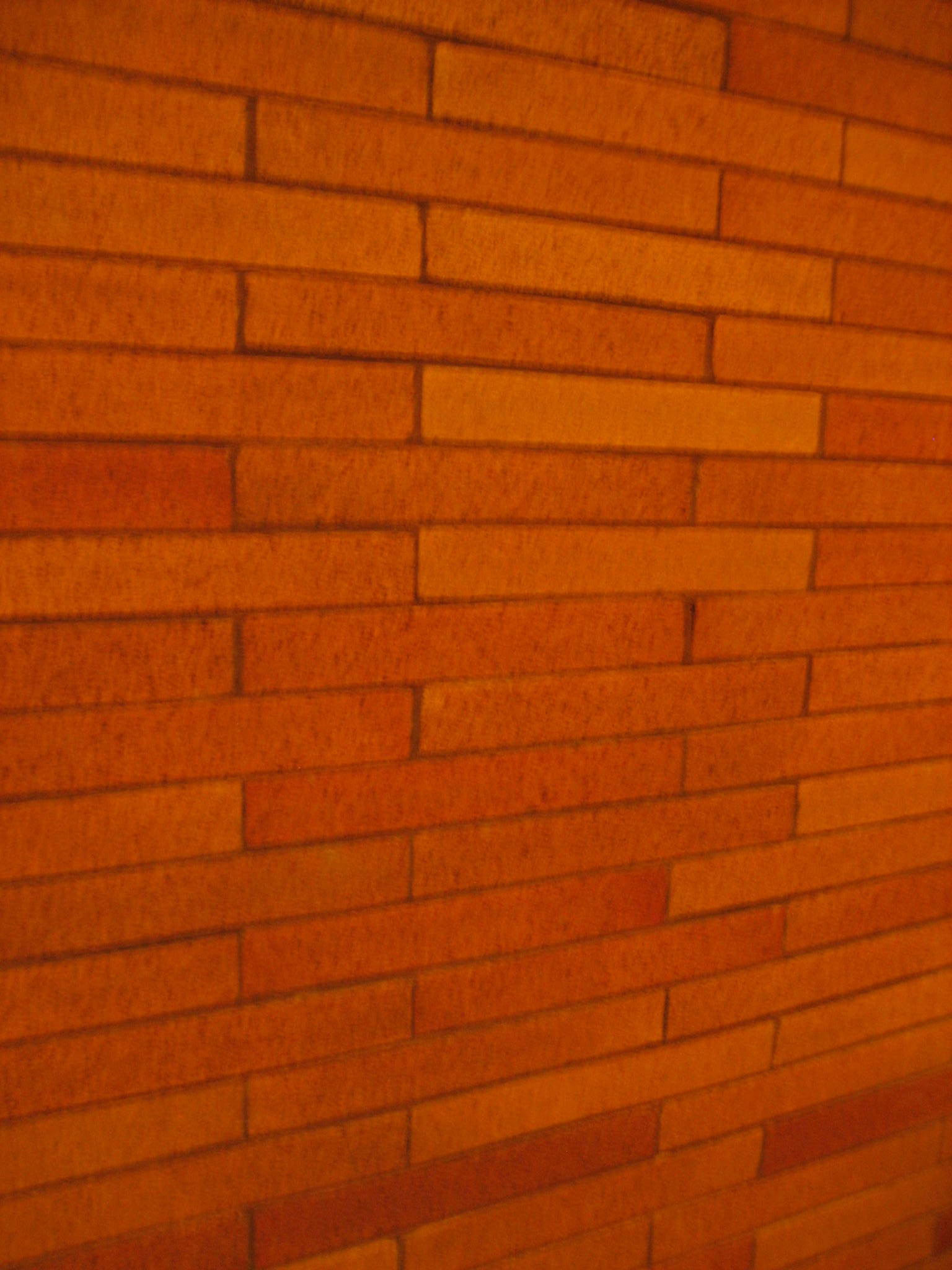
Modern Roman brick in Frank Lloyd Wright's 1905 Frank L. Smith Bank

Modern "Roman" bricks were introduced at the beginning of the 20th century. They are invariably longer and flatter than other modern brick types, but there are no fixed dimensions. Those used in the United States in the early 20th century had nominal dimensions of 4 by 2 by 12 inches (10 cm × 5 cm × 30 cm): this gave them a 6:2:1 ratio, compared with a roughly 4:2:1 ratio of most modern brick types. Others with nominal dimensions of 16 by 6 by 4 inches (41 cm × 15 cm × 10 cm) are also known. Demand has increased the availability of all types of bricks; there are more than a dozen commercially available brick types in modern construction. In 2011, the Roman Brick Company of Glasgow was offering "Roman" bricks in heights of 40, 52, 65 or 71mm; widths of 90 or 115mm; and lengths of 290, 365, 440, 490 and 600mm.

Roman brick was introduced to the United States by the architectural firm McKim, Mead, and White. At one time, Roman brick was one of three available brick types in the United States; the other two were "Standard" (dimensions of 3.625 by 2.25 by 7.625 inches (9 cm × 6 cm × 19 cm)) and "Norman (dimensions of 4 by 2.66 by 12 inches (10 cm × 7 cm × 30 cm))." By 1920, there were at least five types of bricks commonly available to builders and architects, among them: Roman, Norman, Standard, English and Split.

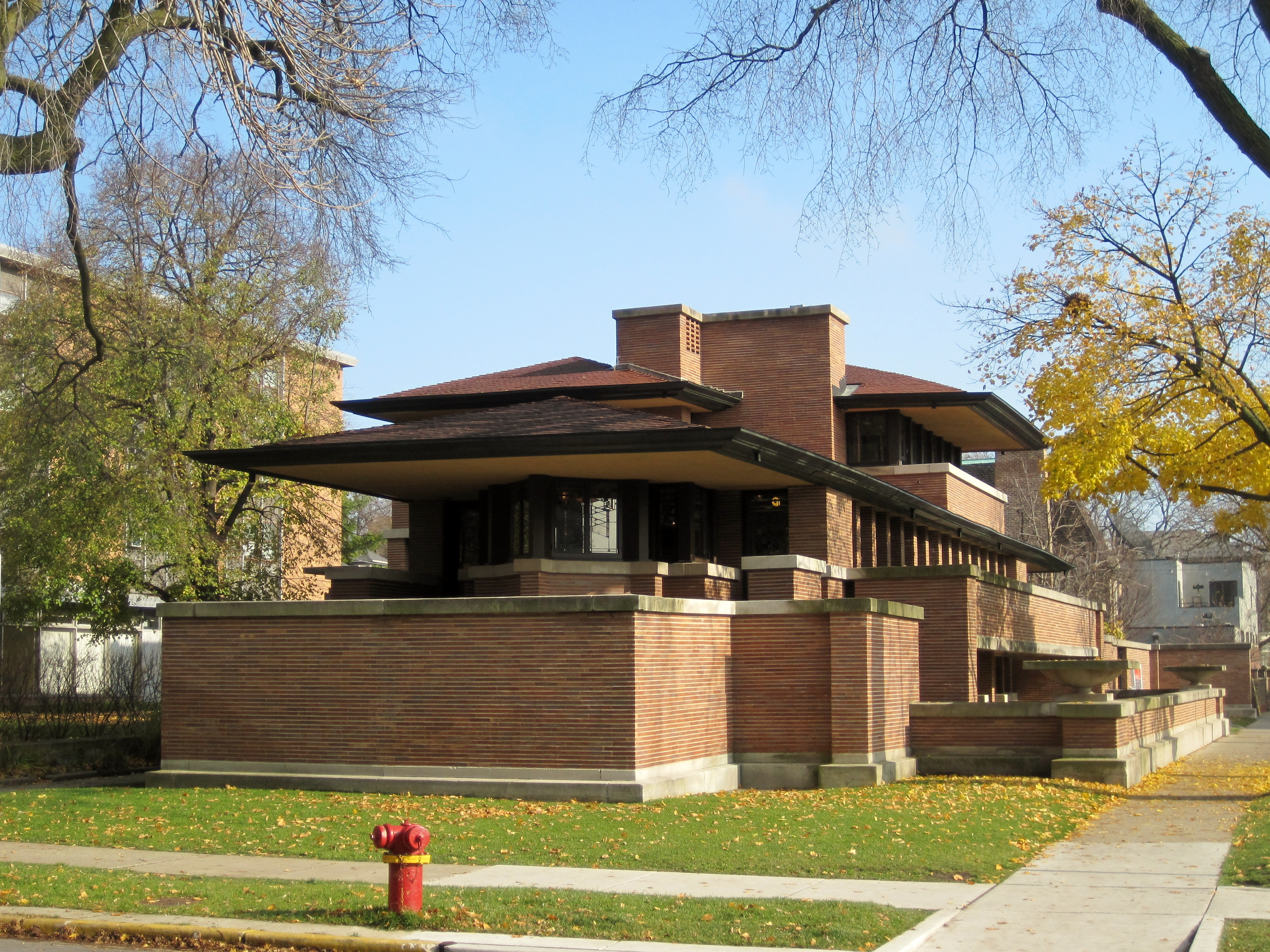
The Robie House in Chicago

Frank Lloyd Wright used Roman brick in his design for the Robie House in Chicago, and he favored it in many of his Prairie style homes. For the Robie House, Wright selected a brick later known as "Pennsylvania Iron Spot Roman brick", personally traveling to St. Louis to choose it. Wright's use of Roman brick in his masonry subtly emphasized the horizontal lines common to much of his Prairie style work. Further highlighting Wright's horizontal emphasis was the use of recessed horizontal mortar joints of contrasting color to the brick. The vertical joints were de-emphasized by ensuring the mortar was flush with, and of the same hue, as the brick. Recently, as historic preservationists work to restore and preserve the work of Wright and his fellow Prairie School architects, Roman brick has proven difficult to obtain.

== Ancient Roman brick stamps ==
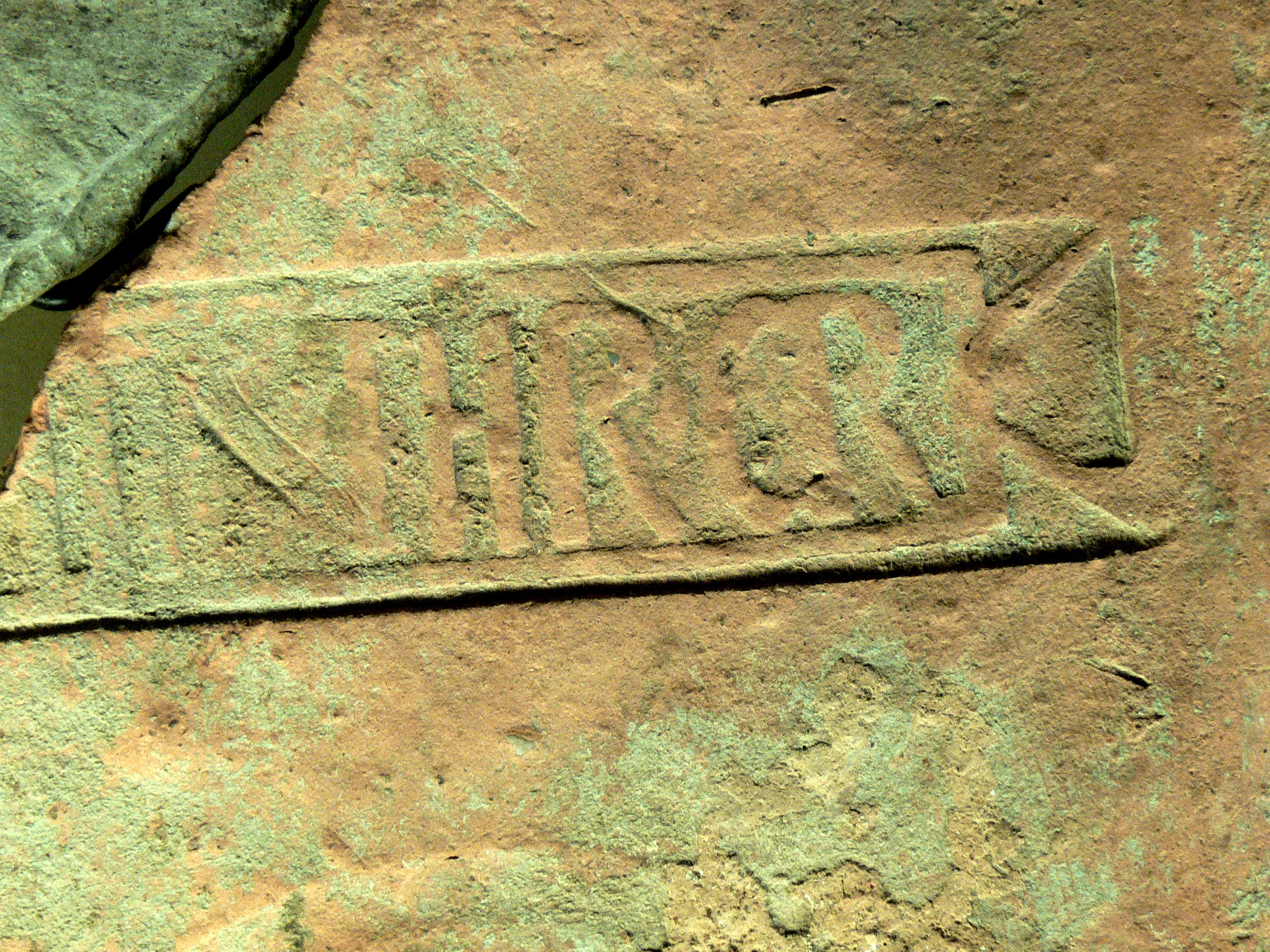
Ancient Roman stamp on a hypocaust brick, used by the third cohort of Roman citizens from Thrace

Around the middle of the 1st century BC Roman brick makers began using unique identifying stamps on their bricks. The first of these brick stamps were simple and included minimal information, such as the name of a person and sometimes the name of the brickyard the brick was produced in. These earliest Roman brick stamps were emblazoned into the wet clay using a hardwood or metal mold prior to the firing of the brick. As the early Roman Empire progressed, fired brick became the primary building material and the number of brick producers increased dramatically as more and more wealthy land owners began to exploit clay deposits on their land for brick-making. Brick stamps began to become more complex and the number of distinguished names multiplied on the brick stamps . In 110, the stamps included, for the first time, the name of the consuls for the year of production, which allows modern observers to pinpoint the year a brick was created.

These brick stamps, once viewed more as a curiosity than archaeological artefacts, allow scholars to learn about the demand for bricks in Ancient Rome because through the dates on the stamps they provide a chronology. Today, brick stamp discoveries are carefully documented and that documentation, combined with the use of architectural context, has helped provide a reliable method of dating Ancient Roman construction. In addition, brick stamps have proved helpful in determining general Ancient Roman chronology.

== Ancient Roman brickyards ==
Most of the Roman bricks were created at brickyards. These brickyards were typically at large estates owned by a wealthy family that had access to clay deposits. There was a hierarchy in the brick production: the domini were the owners of the estate and were typically aristocrats, the officinatores, typically of lower middle class, supervised the brick making process and manufacturing of them, and the figlinae, typically slaves, were those who made the bricks. Men, women, and children all served in varying degrees as members of the landowners, supervisors, and makers. The brick stamps gave recognition to the domini, officinatores, the brickyard it was created at, and consuls serving at the time. Regulations were made on the number of bricks that could be produced in a day and, past that limit, bricks became a public entity.

A Roman brickyard owned by Domitia Calvilla, the mother of the Emperor Marcus Aurelius has been discovered at Bomarzo, 40 miles north of Rome.

== Gallery ==
Roman brick factory in Germany, near the Roman provincial capital of Augsburg

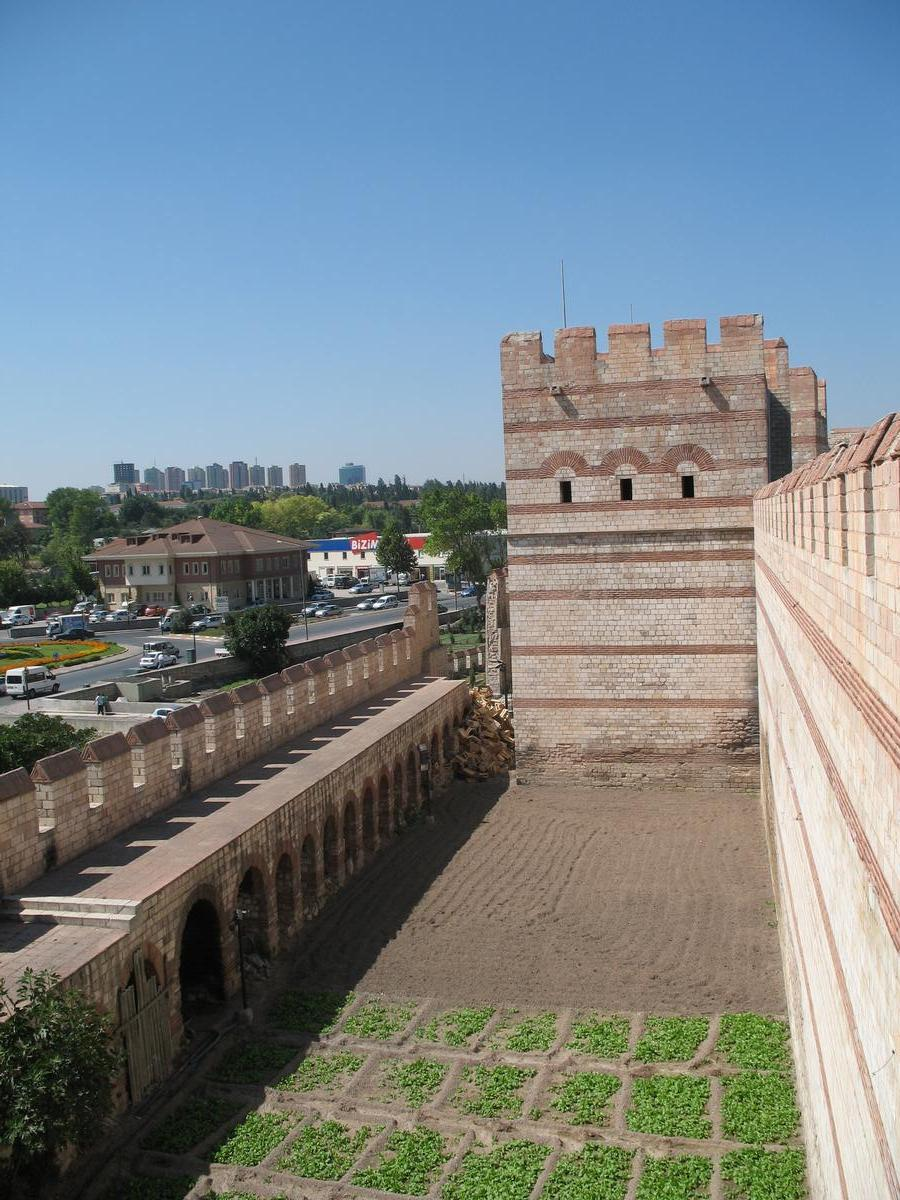
The city walls of Constantinople, showing several courses of brickwork

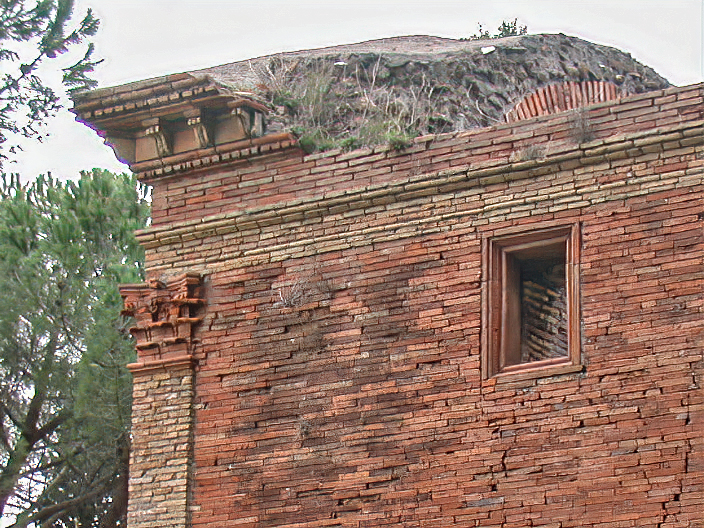
A tomb on the Appian Way in Rome with Roman brickwork in opus latericium

== See also ==
- Roman concrete – Building material used in ancient Rome
- Roman masonry – Building techniques in Ancient Rome
