= Nysa on the Maeander =

Ancient city of Caria, Turkey

Nysa
- Νῦσα (Greek)
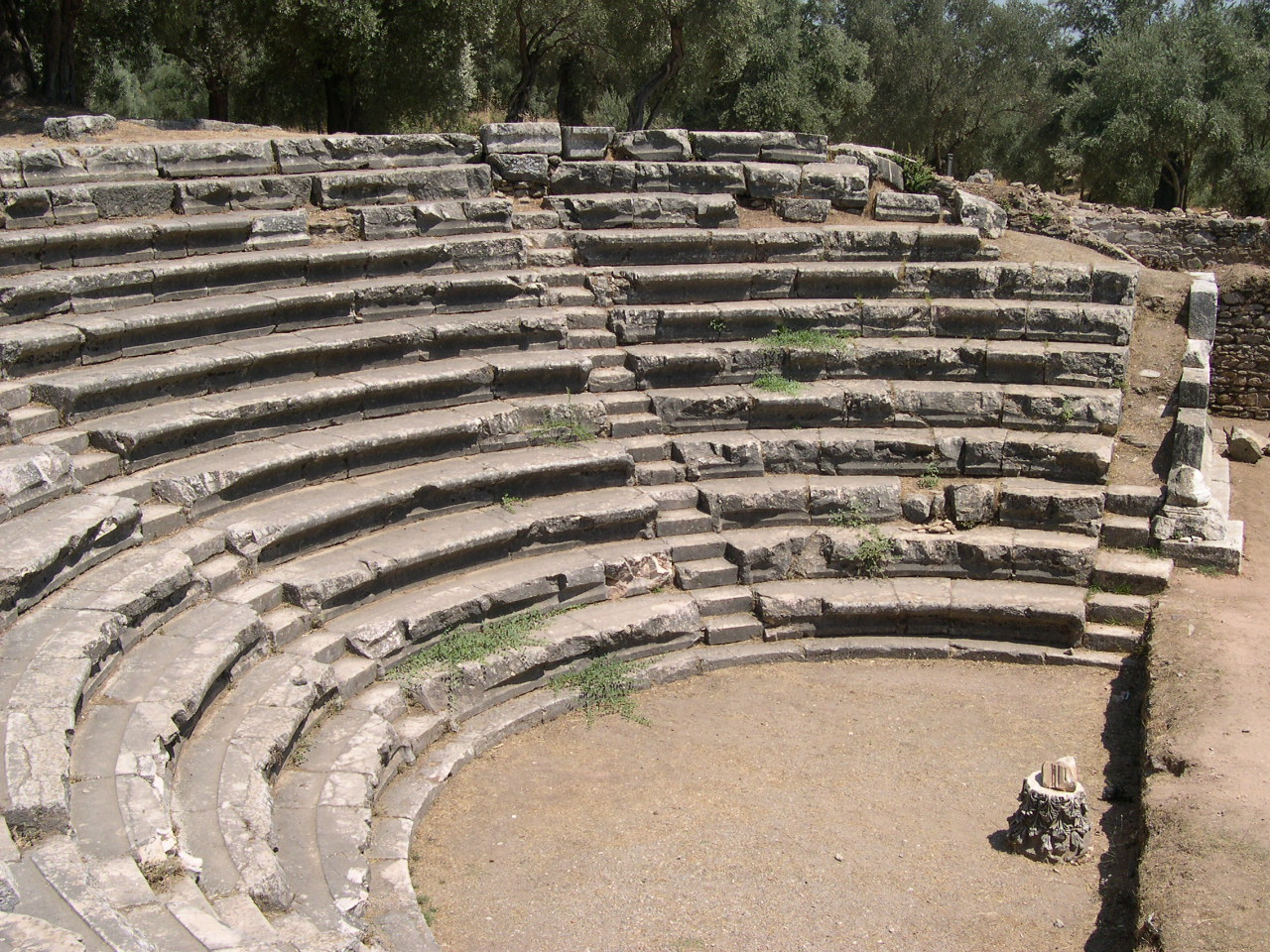
- The bouleuterion/odeion of Nysa

- Location within Turkey
- 37°54′06″N 28°08′48″E
- Type: Settlement
- Location: Sultanhisar, Aydın Province, Turkey
- Region: Caria

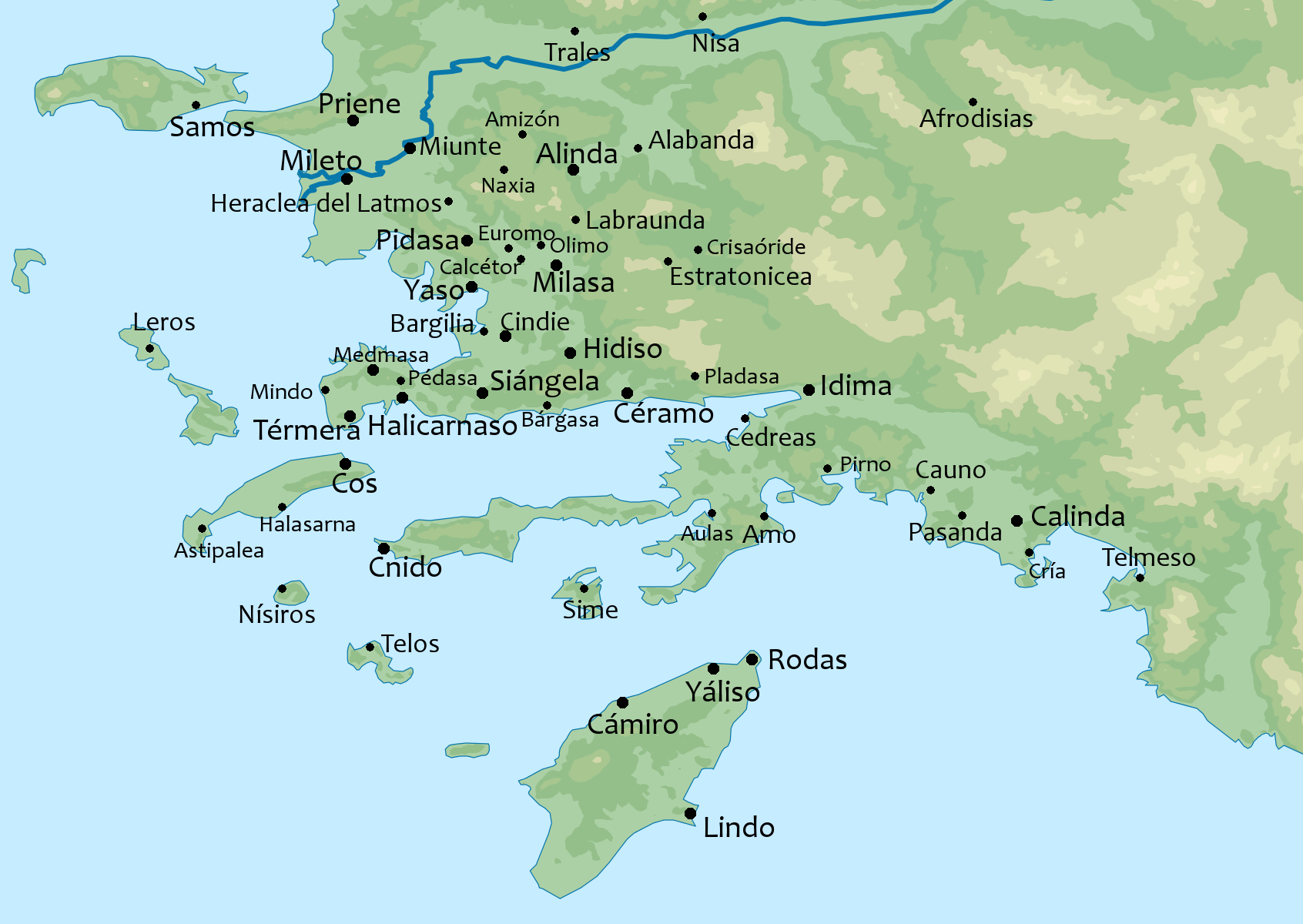
Ancient cities of Caria

Nysa on the Maeander (Greek: Νύσα or Νύσσα) was an ancient city and bishopric of Asia Minor, whose remains are in the Sultanhisar district of Aydın Province of Turkey, 50 kilometres (31 mi) east of the Ionian city of Ephesus, and which remains a Latin Catholic titular see.

At one time it was reckoned as having belonged to Caria or Lydia, but under the Roman Empire it was within the province of Asia, with Ephesus as its capital; the bishop of Nysa was thus a suffragan of the metropolitan see of Ephesus.

Nysa was situated on the southern slope of mount Messogis, on the north of the Maeander, and about midway between Tralles and Antioch on the Maeander. The mountain torrent Eudon, a tributary of the Maeander, flowed through the middle of the town by a deep ravine spanned by a bridge, connecting the two parts of the town. Tradition assigned the foundation of the place to three brothers, Athymbrus (Ἀθυμβρός), Athymbradus (Ἀθύμβραδος), and Hydrelus (Ὕδρηλος), who emigrated from Sparta, and founded three towns on the north of the Maeander; but in the course of time Nysa absorbed them all; the Nysaeans, however, recognise more especially Athymbrus as their founder.

== History ==
In Greek mythology, Dionysus, the god of wine, was born or raised in a place called Nysa or Nyssa, a name that was consequently given to many towns in all parts of the world associated with cultivation of grapes. The name "Nysa" is mentioned in Homer's Iliad (Book 6.132-133), which refers to a hero named Lycurgus, "who once drove the nursing mothers of wine-crazed Dionysus over the sacred mountains of Nysa".

The town derived its name from Nysa, one of the wives of Antiochus I Soter, who reigned from 281 to 261 BC and founded the city on the site of an earlier town called Athymbra (Ἄθυμβρα), a name that continued in use until the second half of the 3rd century BCE (but not in the earliest coinage of Nysa, which is of the next century). According to Stephanus of Byzantium, the town also bore the name Pythopolis (Πυθόπολις).

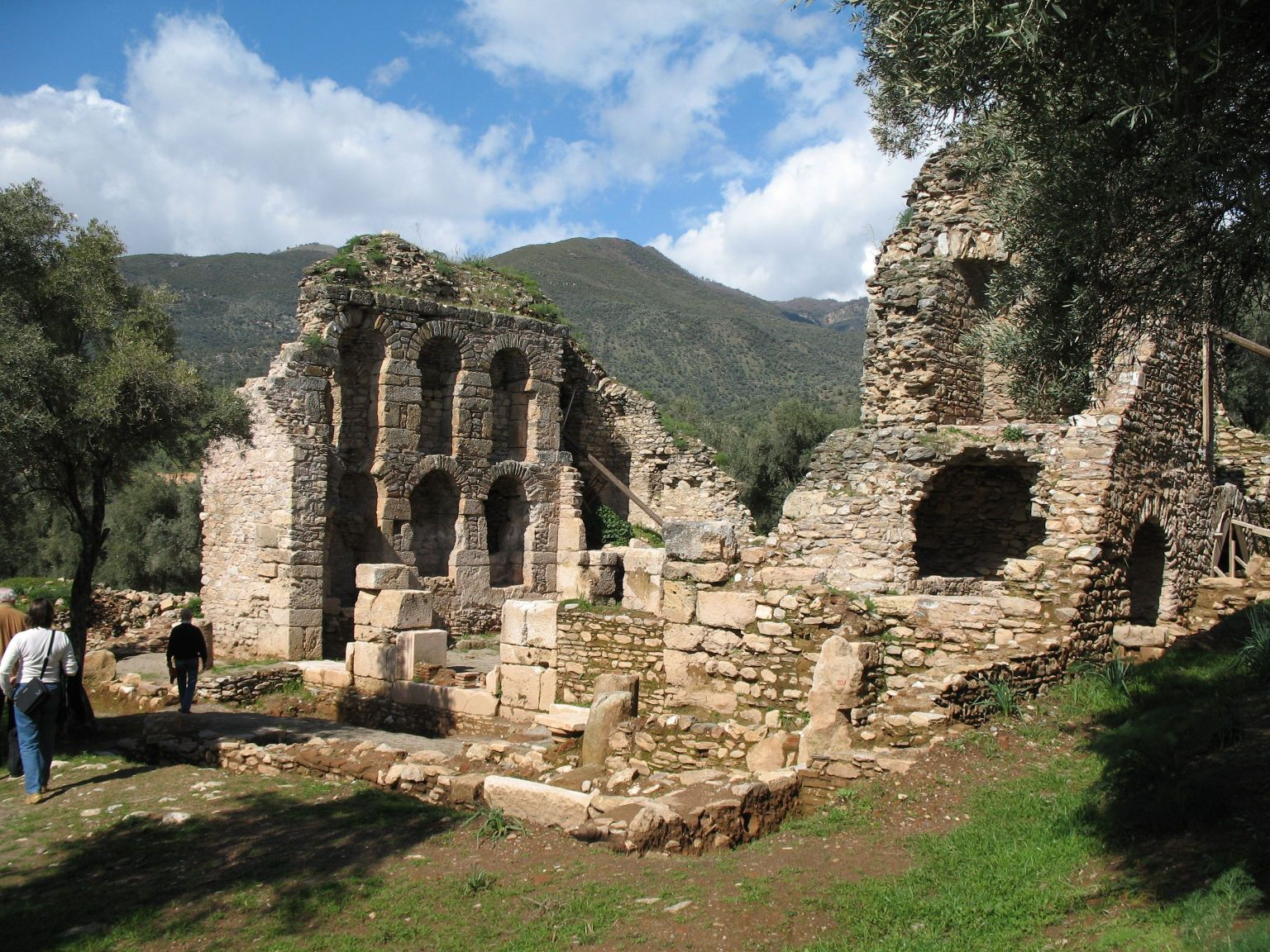
The Library of Nysa

Nysa appears to have been distinguished for its cultivation of literature, for Strabo mentions several eminent philosophers and rhetoricians; and the geographer himself, when a youth, attended the lectures of Aristodemus, a disciple of Panaetius and grandson of the famous Posidonius, whose influence is manifest in Strabo's Geography. Another Aristodemus of Nysa, a cousin of the former, had been the instructor of Pompey. Nysa was then a centre of study that specialized in Homeric literature and the interpretation of epics. Nysa was ruled by the Hellenistic Seleucid Empire, the Roman Empire, its continuation the Byzantine Empire, and by the Turks, until its final abandonment after being sacked by Tamerlane in 1402. The coins of Nysa are very numerous, and exhibit a series of Roman emperors from Augustus to Gallienus.

== Ecclesiastical history ==
Hierocles classes Nysa among the sees of Asia, and its bishops are mentioned in the Councils of Ephesus and Constantinople. Nysa became a suffragan of its provincial capital's metropolitan Archdiocese of Ephesus, I the sway of the Patriarchate of Constantinople. Of the Byzantine bishops of Nysa in Asia, several are historically documented:

- Theodotus took part in the Council of Ephesus (431)
- Maeonius in the Council of Chalcedon (451)
- Sisinnius in the Third Council of Constantinople (680) and the Trullan Council (692)
- Theodosius in the Second Council of Nicaea (787)
- Nicholaus in the Council of Constantinople (869)
- Michael in the 'Photian' Council of Constantinople (879) on the fate of Patriarch Photius I of Constantinople.

=== Titular see ===
The diocese was nominally restored in 1933 as Latin Titular bishopric of Nysa in Asia (Latin) / Nisa di Asia (Curiate Italian) / Nysæus in Asia (Latin adjective), of the Episcopal (lowest) rank, but it remains vacant, never having had an incumbent.

== Remains ==
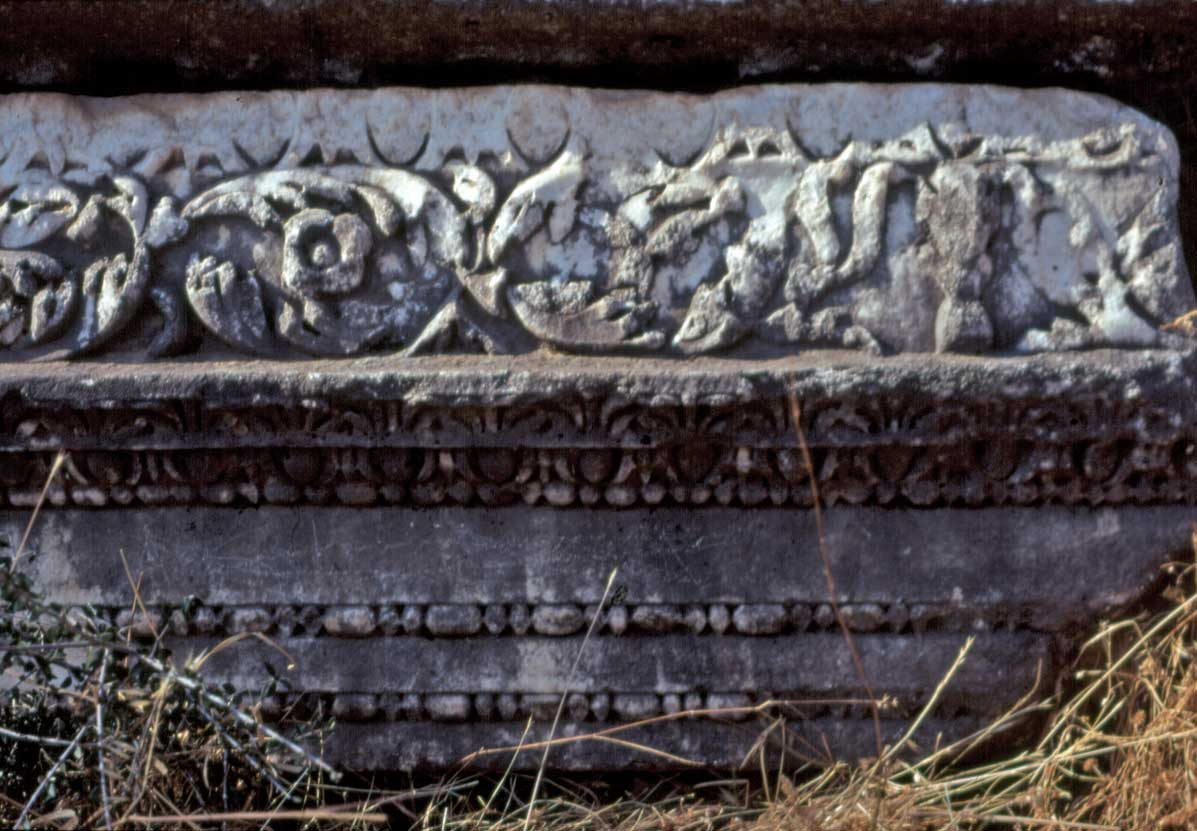
Architrave fragment from the Bouleuterion of Nysa

There are important ruins on the site from the Hellenistic, Roman, and Byzantine periods. The well-preserved theatre, built during the Roman Imperial period, is famous for its friezes depicting the life of Dionysus, god of the grape harvest, winemaking and wine. It has a capacity 12,000 people. The library dating from the 2nd century A.D. is considered to be Turkey's second-best preserved ancient library structure after the "Celsus Library" of Ephesus. The stadium of Nysa, which suffered from floods and is therefore partially damaged, has a capacity of 30,000 people. The bouleuterion (municipal senate), later adapted as an odeon, with 12 rows of seats, offers room for up to 600-700 people. Other significant structures include the agora, gymnasion and the Roman baths. The 100 m long Nysa Bridge, a tunnel-like substructure, was the second largest of its kind in antiquity.

== See also ==
- List of ancient Greek cities

== Sources and external links ==
- GCatholic - (former and) titular see

Bibliography - ecclesiastical history

- Pius Bonifacius Gams, Series episcoporum Ecclesiae Catholicae, Leipzig 1931, p. 444
- Michel Lequien, Oriens christianus in quatuor Patriarchatus digestus, Paris 1740, Vol. I, coll. 705-708
- Pascal Culerrier, Les évêchés suffragants d'Éphèse aux 5e-13e siècles, in Revue des études byzantines, vol; 45, 1987, p. 158
