= Bergama Museum =

- Bergama Müzesi
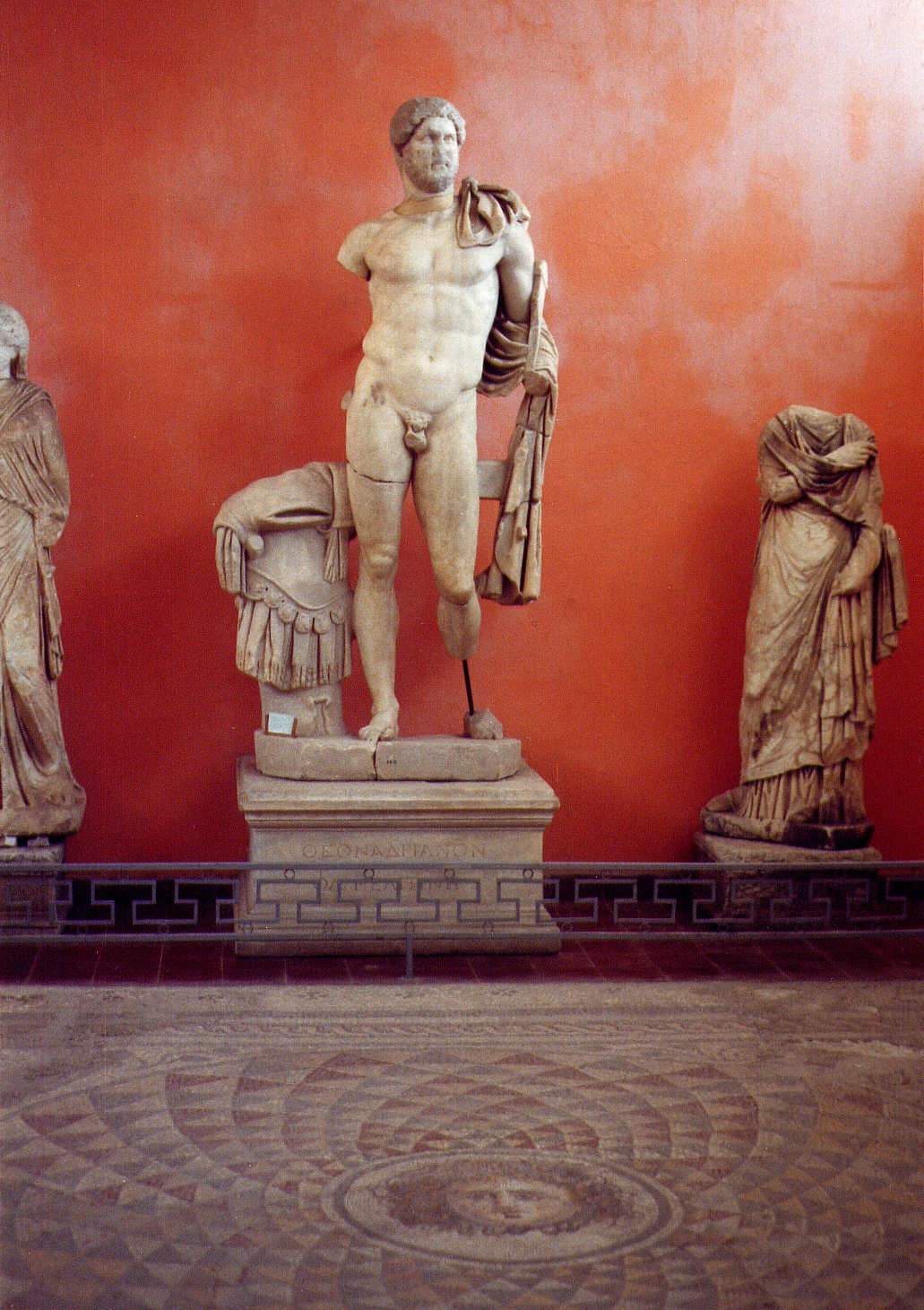
- Hadrian's sculpture in Bergama

- Bergama Museum
- Established: 1936; 90 years ago
- Location: Cumhuriyet Caddesi, Bergama, İzmir, Turkey
- Coordinates: 39°07′00″N 27°10′33″E
- Type: Archaeology museum, Ethnographic museum
- Collections: Hellenistic period, Roman Empire, Byzantine Empire, Ottoman Empire
- Owner: Ministry of Culture and Tourism
- Website: Bergama Museum

Bergama Museum is a museum in Bergama district of İzmir Province, Turkey.

== Location ==
The museum is in Bergama city . It is to the south of Cumhuriyet street at 39°07′00″N 27°10′33″E. Its distance to İzmir is about 110 km (68 mi).

== History ==
Bergama (ancient Pergamon) is a historically important city. Although the remains of the most important ancient monument of Bergama, namely the friezes of the Pergamon Altar had been transported to Berlin, Germany beginning in 1879, there are still enough items to be displayed in Bergama. The museum was established upon the suggestion of Marshal Fevzi Çakmak in 1932. It was opened on 30 October 1936.

== Displays ==
Both the archaeological and ethnographical items are exhibited. The archaeological items are from the excavations around Bergama. Most notable among these are sculptures of Pergamon school, items from Pitane and Gryneion and terra-cotta from Myrina. These ancient greek settlements are between Bergama and İzmir. In the ethnographical section the most important items are carpets and rugs from Bergama, Yuntdağ, Yağcıbekir etc.
