= Pergamon =

Ancient Greek city in Anatolia

- Πέργαμον (Ancient Greek)
- Pergamum
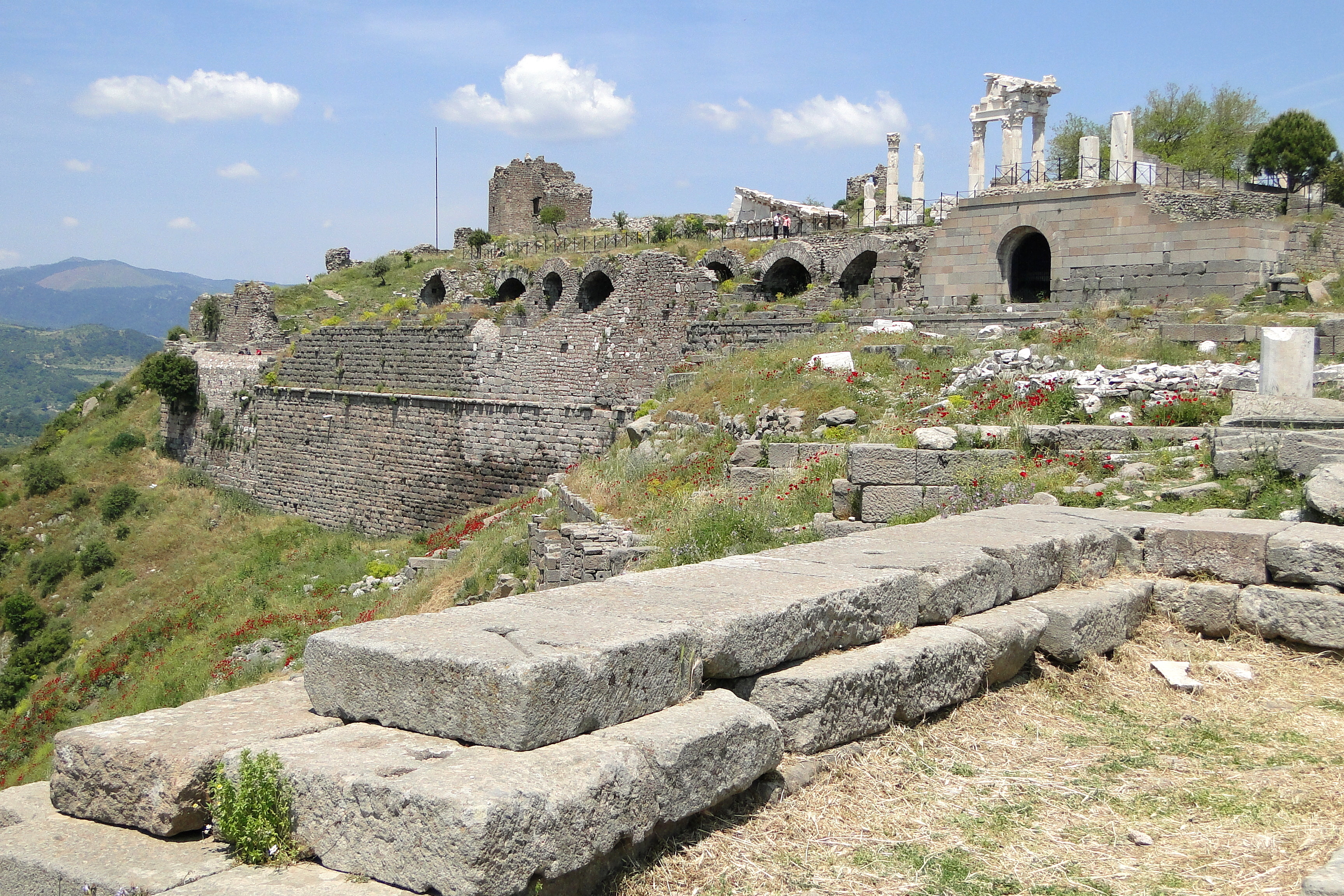
- Acropolis of Pergamon

- Location within Turkey
- 39°07′57″N 27°11′03″E
- Type: Settlement
- Cultures: Greek
- Associated with: Epigonus, Sosus of Pergamon, Aelius Nicon, Galen
- Location: Bergama, İzmir Province, Turkey
- Region: Aeolis

Site notes
- Area: 90 ha (220 acres)
- Condition: Ruined
- Owner: Public
- Public access: Yes

UNESCO World Heritage Site
- Official name: Pergamon and its Multi-Layered Cultural Landscape
- Criteria: Cultural: i, ii, iii, iv, vi
- Reference: 1457
- Inscription: 2014 (38th Session)
- Area: 332.5 ha (822 acres)
- Buffer zone: 476.9 ha (1,178 acres)

Pergamon or Pergamum (/ˈpɜːrɡəmən/ or /ˈpɜːrɡəmɒn/; Ancient Greek: Πέργαμον), also referred to by its modern Greek form Pergamos (Πέργαμος), (Note: An ancient origin for "Pergamos" has often been assumed because of its appearing in the 17th-century King James Bible (Rev 2:12). This was however an erroneous reconstruction by the English translators, and does not appear in the Greek text, which uses either the original Πέργαμον (Rev 1:11) or the dative case Περγάμῳ (Rev 2:12).) was a rich and powerful ancient Greek city in Aeolis. It is located 26 kilometres (16 mi) from the modern coastline of the Aegean Sea on a promontory on the north side of the river Caicus (modern-day Bakırçay) and northwest of the modern city of Bergama, Turkey.

During the Hellenistic period, it became the capital of the Kingdom of Pergamon in 281–133 BC under the Attalid dynasty, who transformed it into one of the major cultural centres of the Greek world. The remains of many of its monuments are still visible today, most notably the masterpiece of the Pergamon Altar. Pergamon was the northernmost of the seven churches of Asia cited in the New Testament Book of Revelation.

The city is centered on a 335-metre-high (1,100 ft) mesa of andesite, which formed its acropolis. This mesa falls away sharply on the north, west, and east sides, but three natural terraces on the south side provide a route up to the top. To the west of the acropolis, the Selinus River (modern Bergamaçay) flows through the city, while the Cetius river (modern Kestelçay) passes by to the east.

Pergamon was added to the UNESCO World Heritage List in 2014.

== Location ==
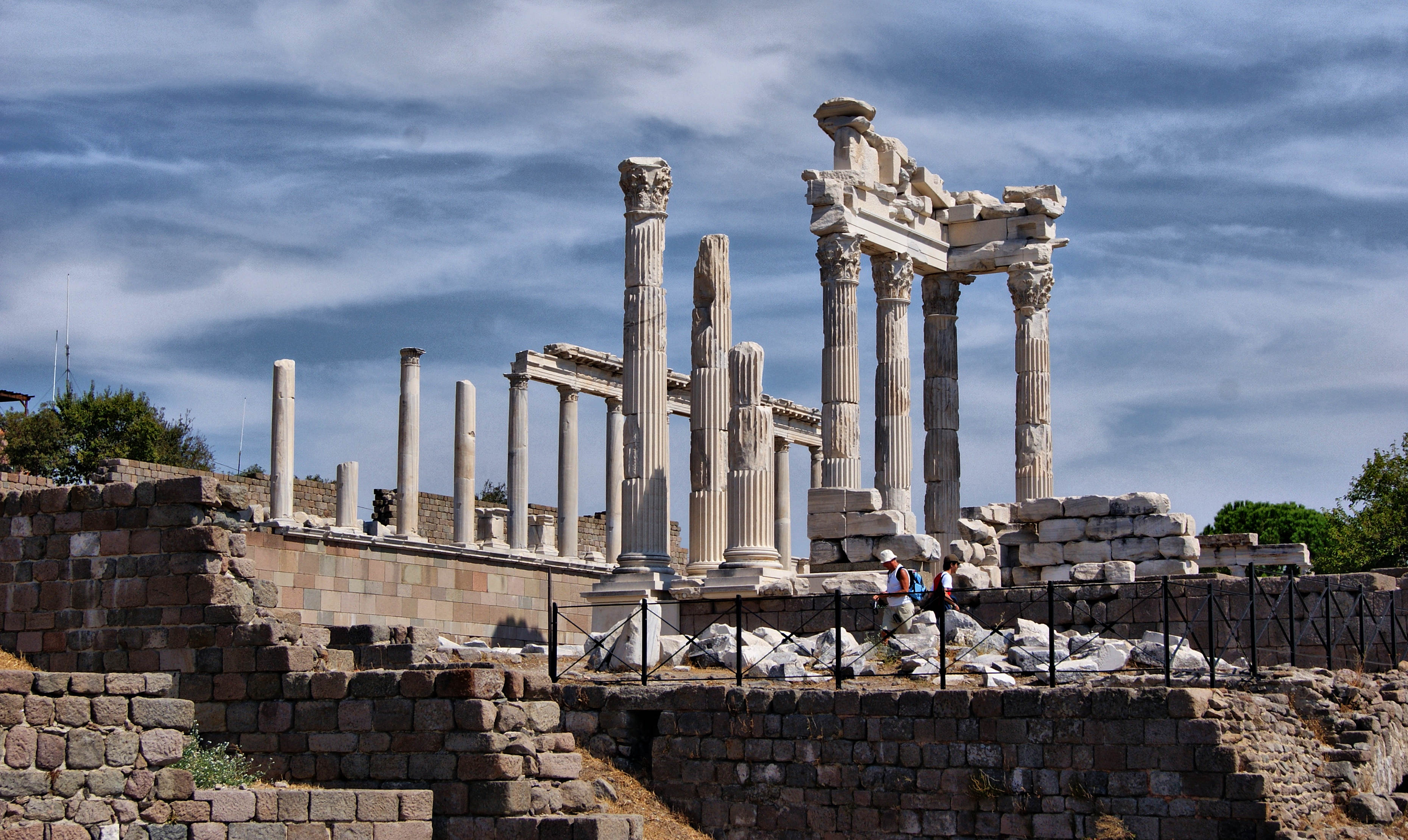
Ruins of the ancient city of Pergamon

Pergamon lies on the north edge of the Caicus plain in the historic region of Mysia in the northwest of Turkey. The Caicus river breaks through the surrounding mountains and hills at this point and flows in a wide arc to the southwest. At the foot of the mountain range to the north, between the rivers Selinus and Cetius, there is the massif of Pergamon which rises 335 metres (1,099 ft) above sea level. The site is only 26 kilometres (16 mi) from the sea, but the Caicus plain is not open to the sea, since the way is blocked by the Karadağ massif. As a result, the area has a strongly inland character. In Hellenistic times, the town of Elaia at the mouth of the Caicus served as the port of Pergamon. The climate is Mediterranean with a dry period from May to August, as is common along the west coast of Asia Minor.

The Caicus valley is mostly composed of volcanic rock, particularly andesite, and the Pergamon massif is also an intrusive stock of andesite. The massif is about one kilometre wide and around 5.5 km long from north to south. It consists of a broad, elongated base and a relatively small peak - the upper city. The side facing the Cetius river is a sharp cliff, while the side facing the Selinus is a little rough. On the north side, the rock forms a 70 metres (230 ft) wide spur of rock. To the southeast of this spur, which is known as the 'Garden of the Queen', the massif reaches its greatest height and breaks off suddenly immediately to the east. The upper city extends for another 250 metres (820 ft) to the south, but it remains very narrow, with a width of only 150 metres (490 ft). At its south end the massif falls gradually to the east and south, widening to around 350 metres (1,150 ft) and then descends to the plain towards the southwest.

== History ==
=== Pre-Hellenistic period ===
Earlier habitation in the Bronze Age cannot be demonstrated, although Bronze Age stone tools are found in the surrounding area.

Settlement of Pergamon can be detected as far back as the Archaic period, thanks to modest archaeological finds, especially fragments of pottery imported from the west, particularly eastern Greece and Corinth, which date to the late 8th century BC.

The earliest mention of Pergamon in literary sources comes from Xenophon's Anabasis, since the march of the Ten Thousand under Xenophon's command ended at Pergamon in 400/399 BC. Xenophon, who calls the city Pergamos, handed over the rest of his Greek troops (some 5,000 men according to Diodorus) to Thibron, who was planning an expedition against the Persian satraps Tissaphernes and Pharnabazus, at this location in March 399 BC. At this time Pergamon was in the possession of the family of Gongylos from Eretria, a Greek favourable to the Achaemenid Empire who had taken refuge in Asia Minor and obtained the territory of Pergamon from Xerxes I, and Xenophon was hosted by his widow Hellas.

In 362 BC, Orontes, satrap of Mysia, used Pergamon as his base for an unsuccessful revolt against the Persian Empire. Only with Alexander the Great were Pergamon and the surrounding area removed from Persian control. There are few traces of the pre-Hellenistic city, since in the following period the terrain was profoundly changed and the construction of broad terraces involved the removal of almost all earlier structures. Parts of the temple of Athena, as well as the walls and foundations of the altar in the sanctuary of Demeter, go back to the fourth century.

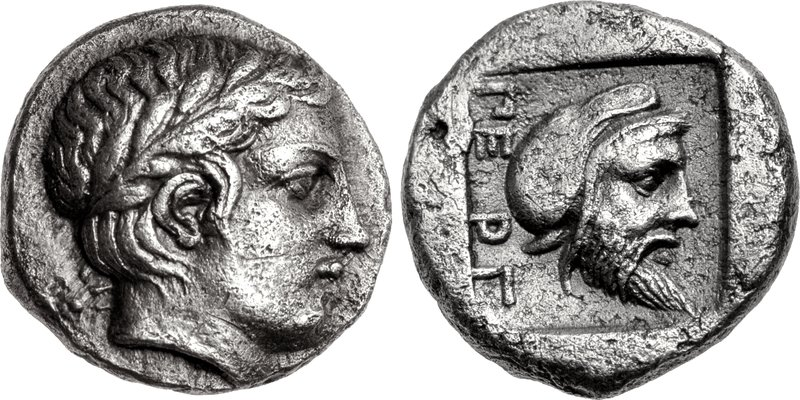
Possible coinage of the Greek ruler Gongylos, wearing the Persian cap on the reverse, as ruler of Pergamon for the Achaemenid Empire. Pergamon, Mysia, circa 450 BC. The name of the city ΠΕΡΓ ("PERG"), appears for the first on this coinage, and is the first evidence for the name of the city.

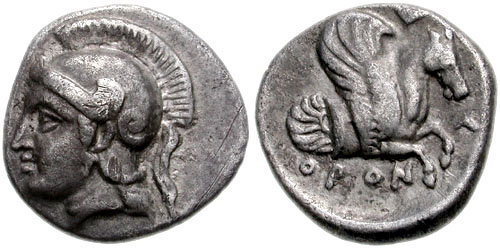
Coin of Orontes, Achaemenid Satrap of Mysia (including Pergamon), Adramyteion. Circa 357-352 BC

=== Hellenistic period ===
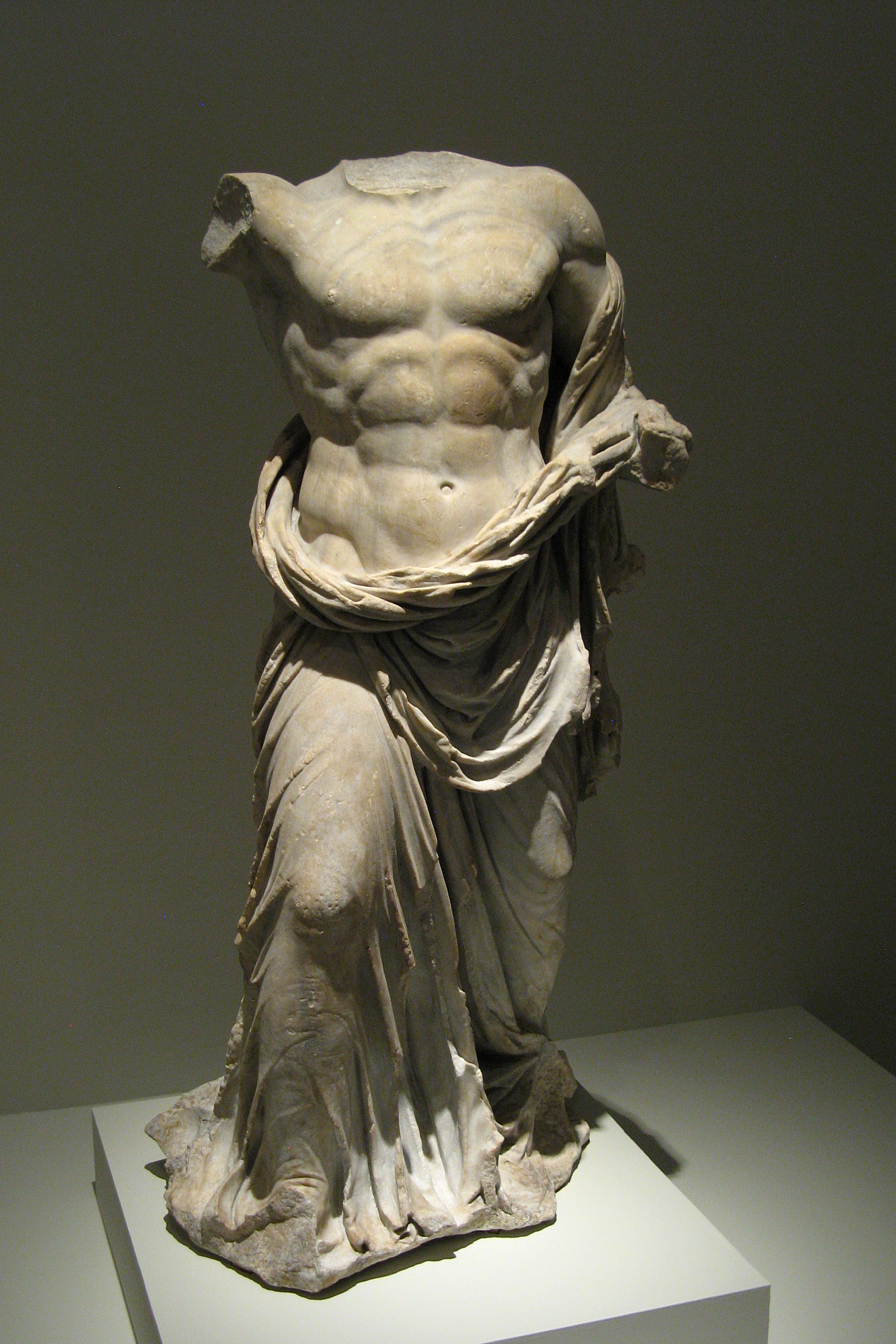
Statue of a striding male figure, sometimes identified as Zeus, from Pergamon

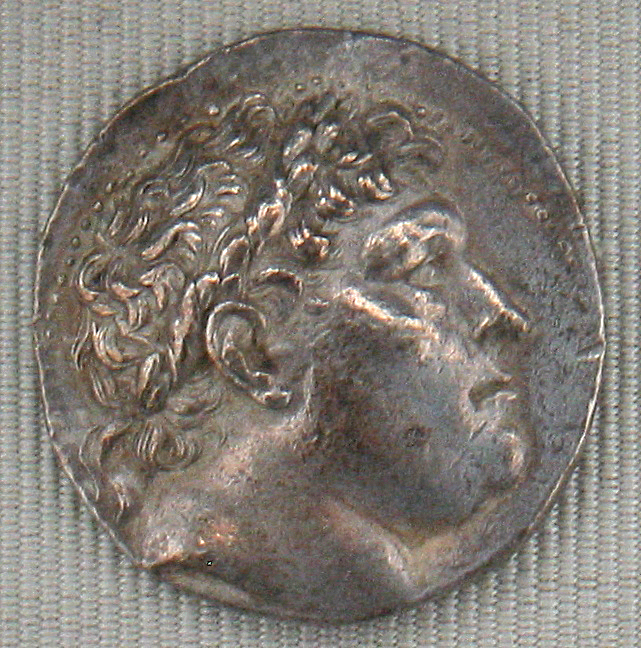
Image of Philetaerus on a coin of Eumenes I

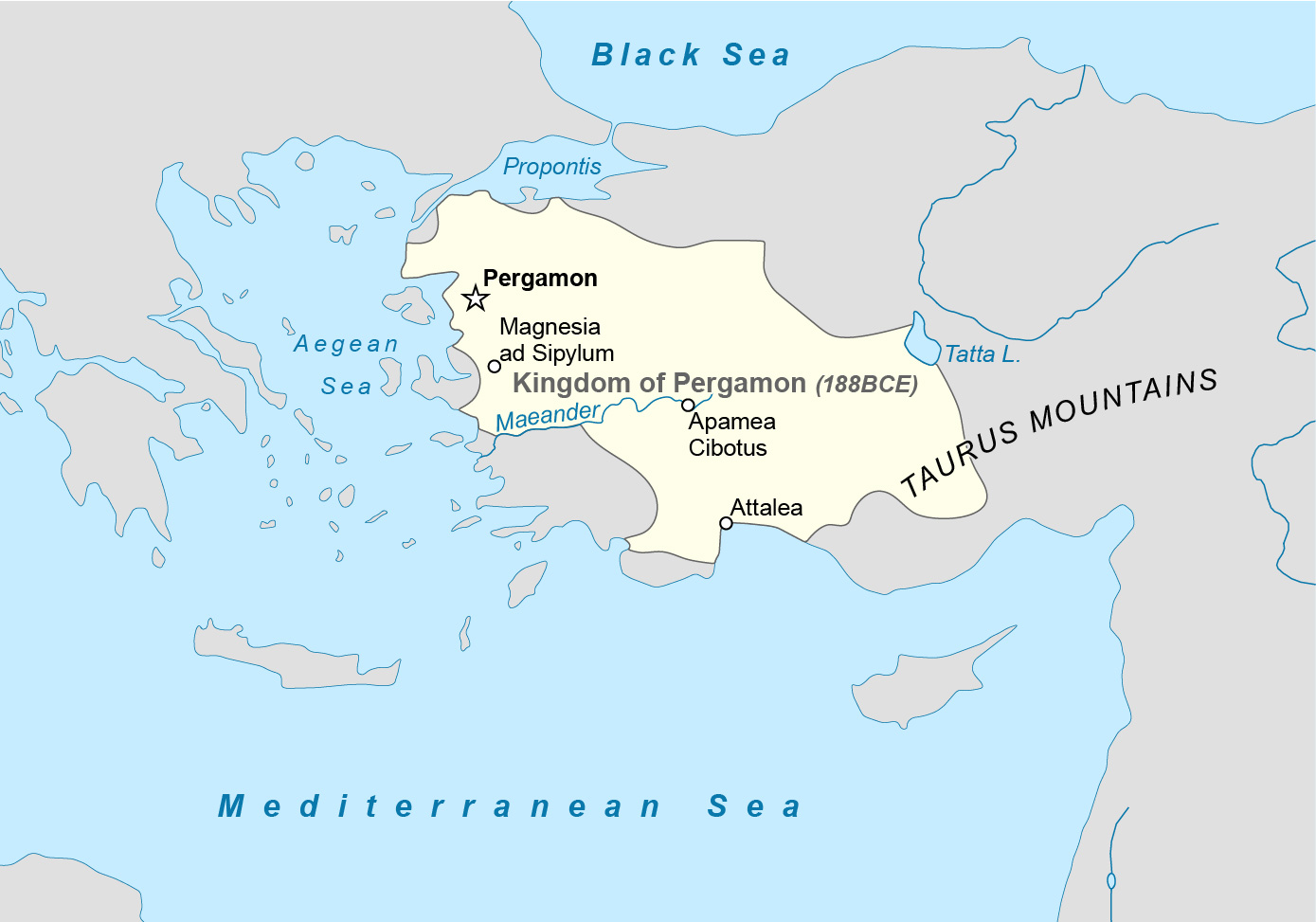
The Kingdom of Pergamon, shown at its greatest extent in 188 BC

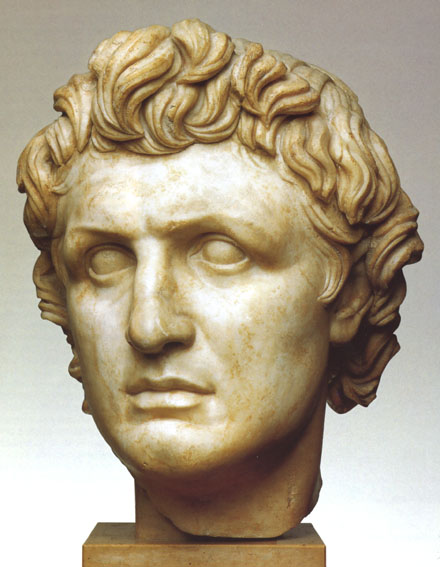
Over-life-size portrait head, probably of Attalus I

Lysimachus, King of Thrace, took possession in 301 BC, and the town was enlarged by his lieutenant Philetaerus. In 281 BC the kingdom of Thrace collapsed and Philetaerus became an independent ruler, founding the Attalid dynasty. His family ruled Pergamon from 281 until 133 BC: Philetaerus 281–263; Eumenes I 263–241; Attalus I 241–197; Eumenes II 197–159; Attalus II 159–138; and Attalus III 138–133. Philetaerus controlled only Pergamon and its immediate environs, but the city acquired much new territory under Eumenes I. In particular, after the Battle of Sardis in 261 BC against Antiochus I, Eumenes was able to appropriate the area down to the coast and some way inland. Despite this increase of his domain, Eumenes did not take a royal title. In 238 his successor Attalus I defeated the Galatians, to whom Pergamon had paid tribute under Eumenes I. Attalus thereafter declared himself leader of an entirely independent Pergamene kingdom.

The Attalids became some of the most loyal supporters of Rome in the Hellenistic world. Attalus I allied with Rome against Philip V of Macedon, during the first and second Macedonian Wars. In the Roman–Seleucid War, Pergamon joined the Romans' coalition against Antiochus III, and was rewarded with almost all the former Seleucid domains in Asia Minor at the Peace of Apamea in 188 BC. The kingdom's territories thus reached their greatest extent. Eumenes II supported Rome again in the Third Macedonian War, but the Romans heard rumours of his conducting secret negotiations with their opponent Perseus of Macedon. On this basis, Rome denied any reward to Pergamon and attempted to replace Eumenes with the future Attalus II, who refused to cooperate. These incidents cost Pergamon its privileged status with the Romans, who granted it no further territory.

Nevertheless, under the brothers Eumenes II and Attalus II, Pergamon reached its apex and was rebuilt on a monumental scale. It had retained the same dimensions for a long interval after its founding by Philetaerus, covering c. 21 hectares (52 acres). After 188 BC a massive new city wall was constructed, 4 kilometres (2.5 mi) long and enclosing an area of approximately 90 hectares (220 acres). The Attalids' goal was to create a second Athens, a cultural and artistic hub of the Greek world. They remodeled their Acropolis after the Acropolis in Athens, and the Library of Pergamon was renowned as second only to the Library of Alexandria. Pergamon was also a flourishing center for the production of parchment, whose name is a corruption of pergamenos, meaning "from Pergamon". Despite this etymology, parchment had been used in Asia Minor long before the rise of the city; the story that it was invented by the Pergamenes, to circumvent the Ptolemies' monopoly on papyrus production, is not true. In fact, parchment had been in use in Anatolia and elsewhere long before the rise of Pergamon.

Surviving epigraphic documents show how the Attalids supported the growth of towns by sending in skilled artisans and by remitting taxes. They allowed the Greek cities in their domains to maintain nominal independence, and sent gifts to Greek cultural sites like Delphi, Delos, and Athens. The two brothers Eumenes II and Attalus II displayed the most distinctive trait of the Attalids: a pronounced sense of family without rivalry or intrigue - rare amongst the Hellenistic dynasties. Attalus II bore the epithet 'Philadelphos', 'he who loves his brother', and his relations with Eumenes II were compared to the harmony between the mythical brothers Cleobis and Biton.

When Attalus III died without an heir in 133 BC, he bequeathed the whole of Pergamon to Rome. This was challenged by Aristonicus, who claimed to be Attalus III's brother and led an armed uprising against the Romans with the help of Blossius, a famous Stoic philosopher. For a period he enjoyed success, defeating and killing the Roman consul P. Licinius Crassus and his army, but he was defeated in 129 BC by the consul M. Perperna. The Attalid kingdom was divided between Rome, Pontus, and Cappadocia, with the bulk of its territory becoming the new Roman province of Asia. The city itself was declared free and served briefly as capital of the province, before this distinction was transferred to Ephesus.

=== Roman period ===
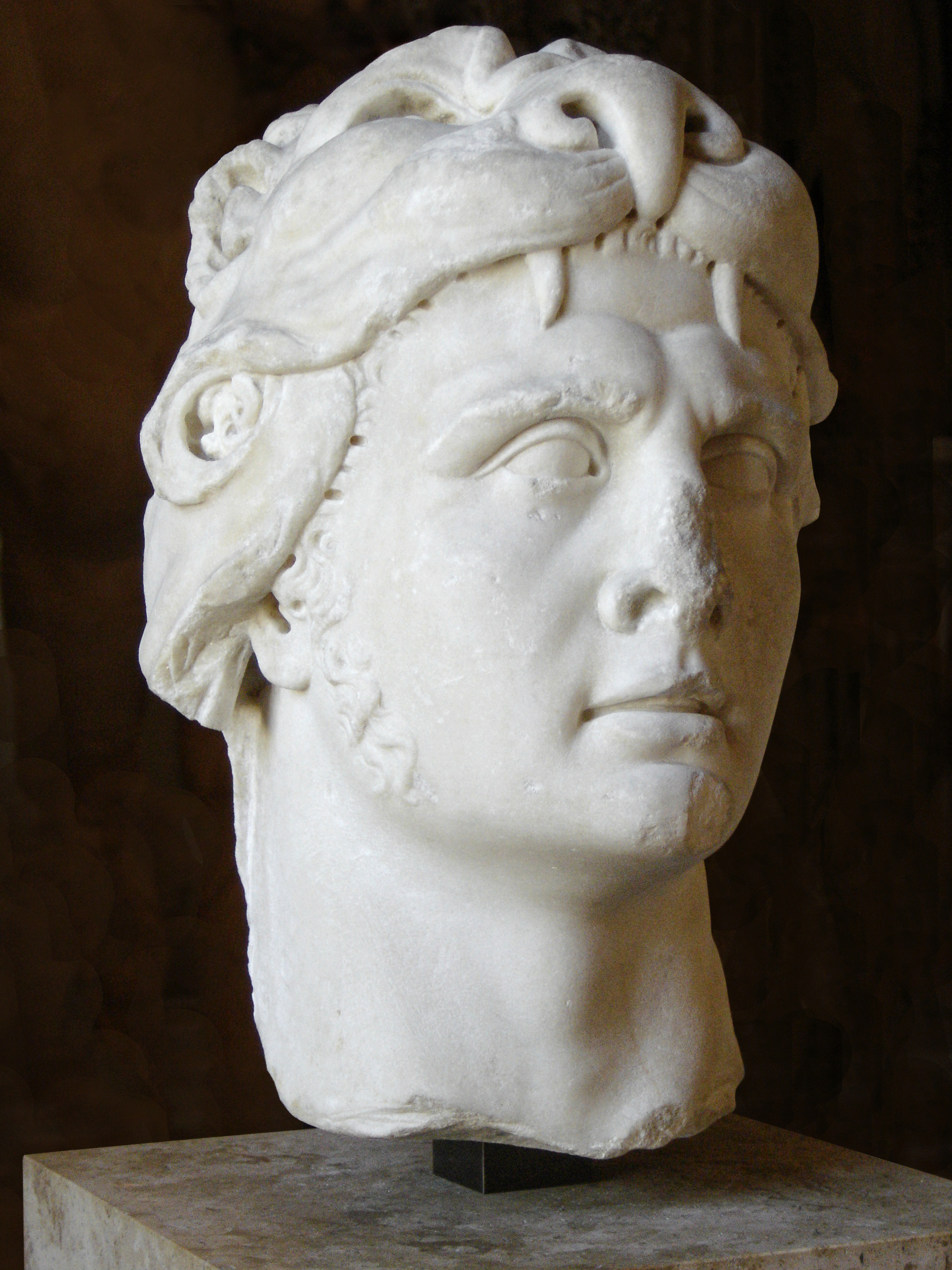
Mithridates VI, portrait in the Louvre

In 88 BC, Mithridates VI Eupator made Pergamon his headquarters in his first war against Rome, in which he was defeated. The victorious Romans deprived Pergamon of all its benefits and of its status as a free city. Henceforth the city was required to pay tribute and accommodate and supply Roman troops, and the property of many of the inhabitants was confiscated. Imported Pergamene goods were among the luxuries enjoyed by Lucullus. The members of the Pergamene aristocracy, especially Diodorus Pasparus in the 70s BC, used their own possessions to maintain good relationships with Rome, by acting as donors for the development of the city. Numerous honorific inscriptions indicate Pasparus' work and his exceptional position in Pergamon at this time.

Pergamon still remained a famous city, and was the seat of a conventus (regional assembly). Its neocorate, granted by Augustus, was the first manifestation of the imperial cult in the province of Asia. Pliny the Elder refers to the city as the most important in the province and the local aristocracy continued to reach the highest circles of power in the 1st century AD, like Aulus Julius Quadratus who was consul in 94 and 105.

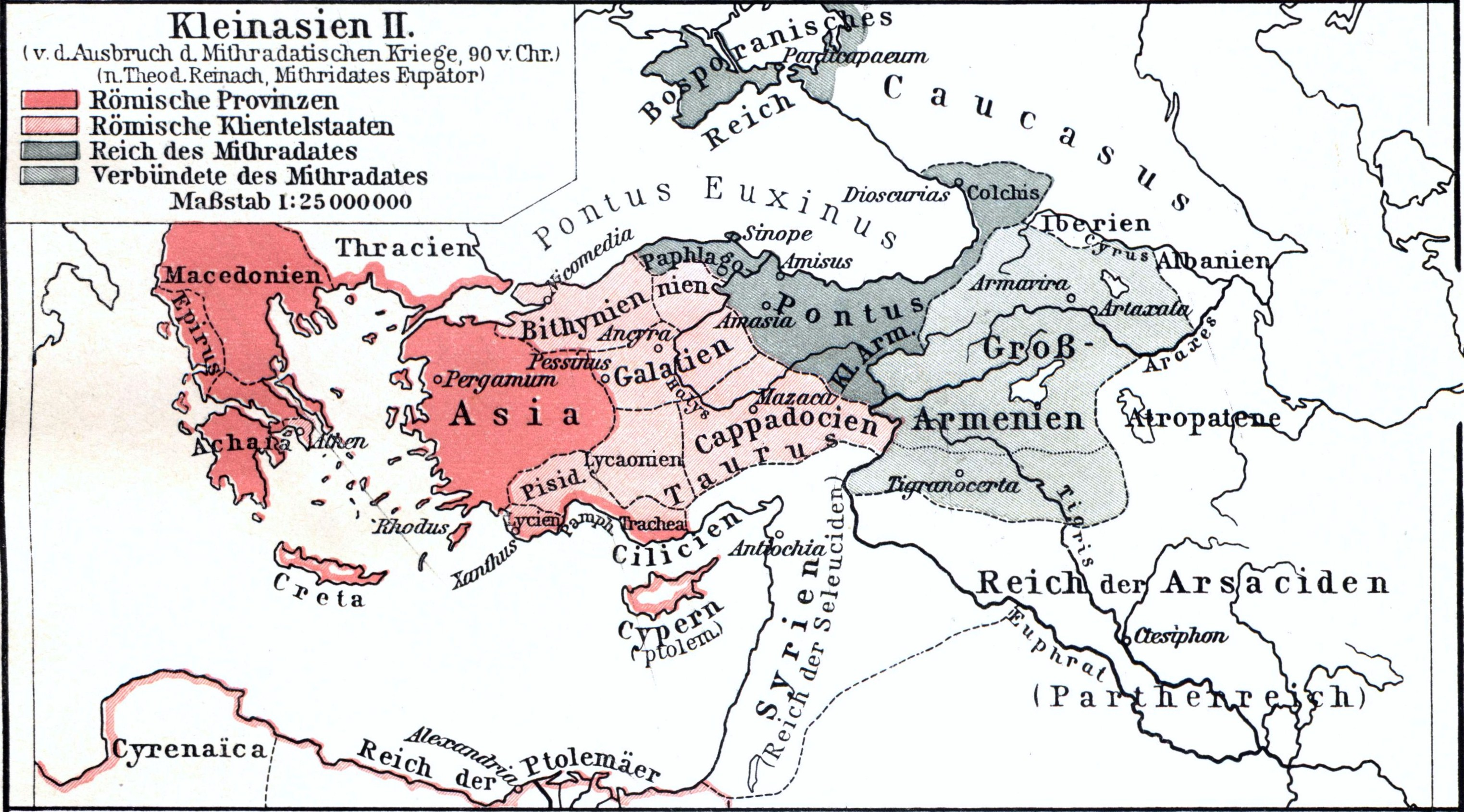
Pergamon in the Roman province of Asia, 90 BC

Yet it was only under Trajan and his successors that a comprehensive redesign and remodelling took place, with the construction of a Roman 'new city' at the base of the Acropolis. The city was the first in the province to receive a second neocorate, from Trajan in AD 113/4. Hadrian raised the city to the rank of metropolis in 123 and thereby elevated it above its local rivals, Ephesus and Smyrna. An ambitious building programme was carried out: massive temples, a stadium, a theatre, a huge forum and an amphitheatre were constructed. In addition, at the city limits the shrine to Asclepius (the god of healing) was expanded into a lavish spa. This sanctuary grew in fame and was considered one of the most famous healing centers of the Roman world.

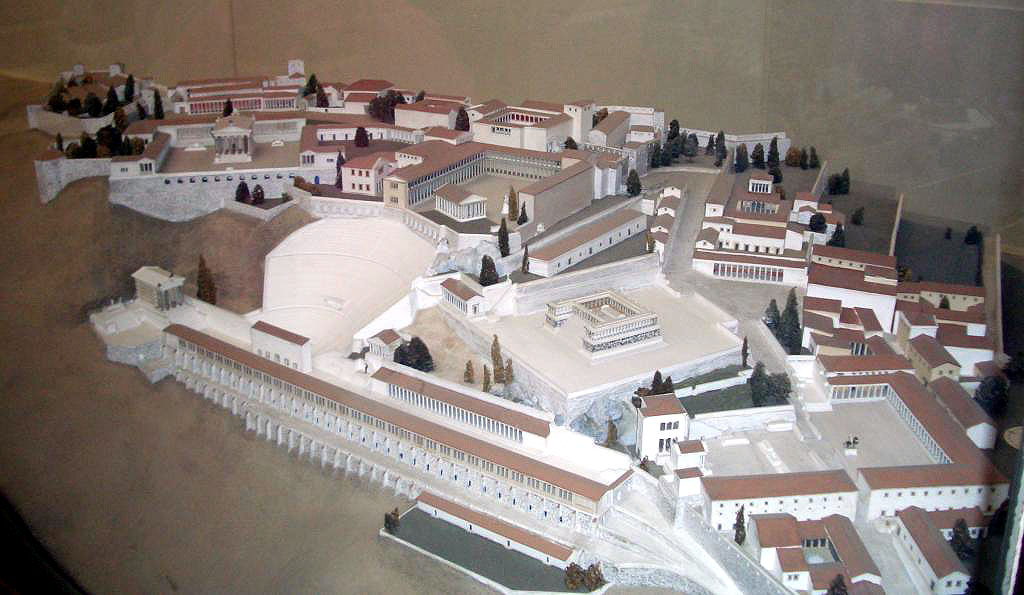
A model of the acropolis of Pergamon, showing the situation in the 2nd century CE

In the middle of the 2nd century Pergamon was one of the largest cities in the province, and had around 200,000 inhabitants. Galen, the most famous physician of antiquity aside from Hippocrates, was born at Pergamon and received his early training at the Asclepieion. At the beginning of the 3rd century Caracalla granted the city a third neocorate, but a decline had already set in. The economic strength of Pergamon collapsed during the crisis of the Third Century, as the city was badly damaged in an earthquake in 262 and was sacked by the Goths shortly thereafter. In late antiquity, it experienced a limited economic recovery.

=== Byzantine period ===
In AD 663/4, Pergamon was captured by raiding Arabs for the first time. As a result of the ongoing Arab threat, the area of settlement retracted to the acropolis, which the Emperor Constans II (r. 641–668) fortified with a 6-meter-thick (20 ft) wall built of spolia.

During the middle Byzantine period, the city was part of the Thracesian Theme, and from the time of Leo VI the Wise (r. 886–912) of the Theme of Samos. 7th-century sources attest an Armenian community in Pergamon, probably formed of refugees from the Muslim conquests; this community produced the emperor Philippicus (r. 711–713). In 716, Pergamon was sacked again by the armies of Maslama ibn Abd al-Malik. It was again rebuilt and refortified after the Arabs abandoned their Siege of Constantinople in 717–718.

Pergamon suffered from the Seljuk invasion of western Anatolia after the Battle of Manzikert in 1071. Attacks in 1109 and 1113 largely destroyed the city, which was only rebuilt, by Emperor Manuel I Komnenos (r. 1143–1180), around 1170. It likely became the capital of the new theme of Neokastra, established by Manuel. Under Isaac II Angelos (r. 1185–1195), the local see was promoted to a metropolitan bishopric, having previously been a suffragan diocese of the Metropolis of Ephesus.

After the Sack of Constantinople in 1204 during the Fourth Crusade, Pergamon became part of the Empire of Nicaea. When Emperor Theodore II Laskaris (r. 1254–1285) visited Pergamon in 1250, he was shown the house of Galen, but he saw that the theatre had been destroyed and, except for the walls which he paid some attention to, only the vaults over the Selinus seemed noteworthy to him. The monuments of the Attalids and the Romans were only plundered ruins by this time.

=== Anatolian Beyliks and Ottomans ===
With the expansion of the Anatolian beyliks, Pergamon fell to the Karasids shortly after 1300, and was then conquered by the Ottoman beylik. Due to its conquest, by 1387 the metropolis of Pergamon was assumed by Ephesus, due to their shared decline, and by the 15th century, the it had disappeared from the records.

In the 16th century, the Ottoman Sultan Murad III had two large alabaster urns transported from the ruins of Pergamon and placed on two sides of the nave in the Hagia Sophia.

== Pergamon in myth ==
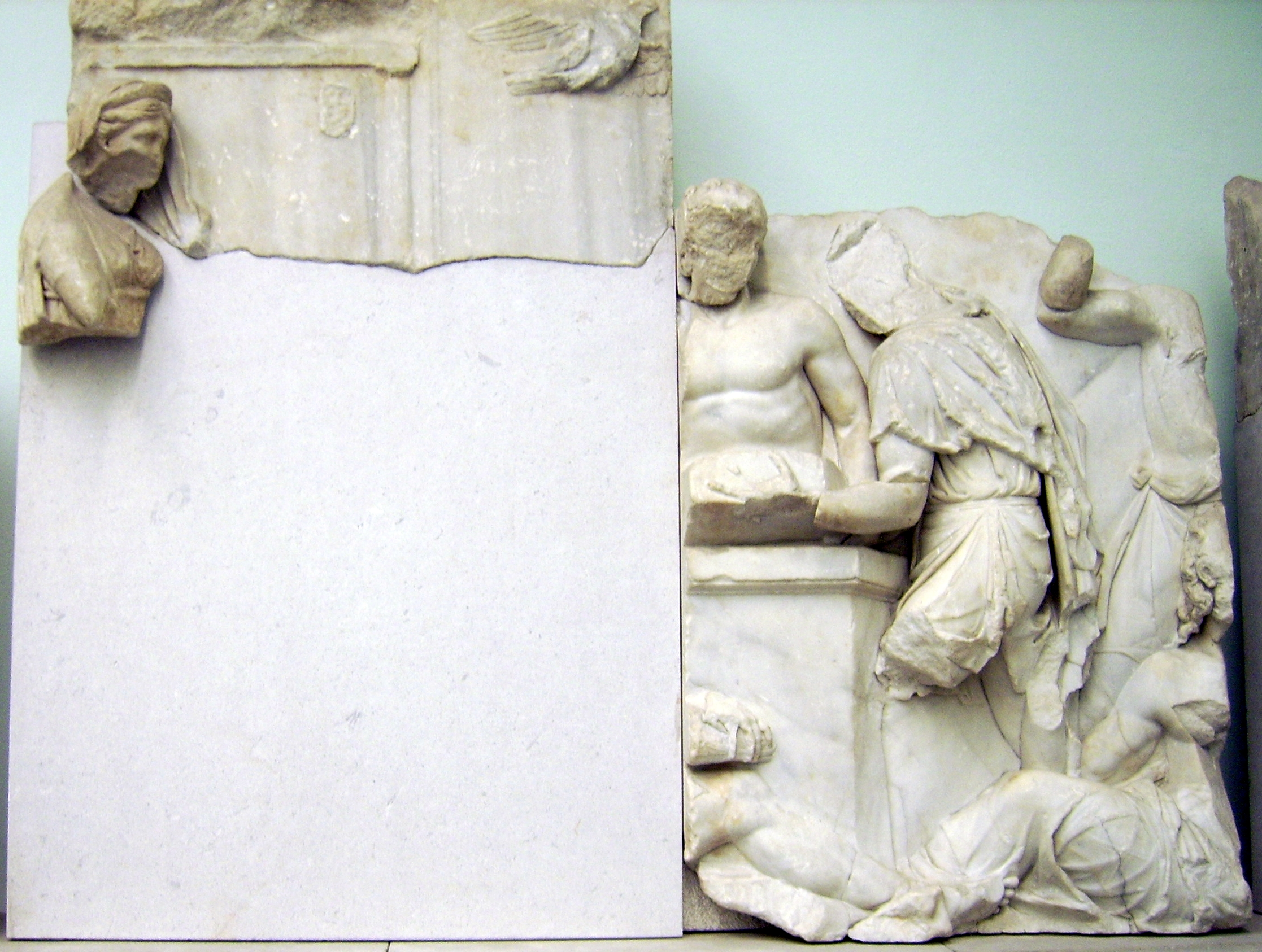
Founding of Pergamon: depiction from the Telephos frieze of the Pergamon altar

Pergamon, which traced its founding back to Telephus, the son of Heracles, is not mentioned in Greek myth or epic of the archaic or classical periods. However, in the Epic Cycle the Telephus myth is already connected with the area of Mysia. Searching for his mother, Telephus visits Mysia on the advice of an oracle. There he becomes Teuthras' son-in-law or foster-son and inherits his kingdom of Teuthrania, encompassing the area between Pergamon and the mouth of the Caicus. Telephus refuses to participate in the Trojan War, but his son Eurypylus fights on the side of the Trojans. This material was dealt with in a number of tragedies, such as Aeschylus' Mysi, Sophocles' Aleadae, and Euripides' Telephus and Auge, but Pergamon does not seem to have played any role in any of them. The adaptation of the myth is not entirely smooth.

Thus, on the one hand, Eurypylus who must have been part of the dynastic line as a result of the appropriation of the myth, was not mentioned in the hymn sung in honour of Telephus in the Asclepieion. Otherwise he does not seem to have been paid any heed. But the Pergamenes made offerings to Telephus and the grave of his mother Auge was located in Pergamon near the Caicus. Pergamon thus entered the Trojan epic cycle, with its ruler said to have been an Arcadian who had fought with Telephus against Agamemnon when he landed at the Caicus, mistook it for Troy and began to ravage the land.

On the other hand, the story was linked to the foundation of the city with another myth – that of Pergamus, the eponymous hero of the city. He also belonged to the broader cycle of myths related to the Trojan War as the grandson of Achilles through his father Neoptolemus and of Eetion of Thebe through his mother Andromache (concubine to Neoptolemus after the death of Hector of Troy). With his mother, he was said to have fled to Mysia where he killed the ruler of Teuthrania and gave the city his own name. There he built a heroon for his mother after her death. In a less heroic version, Grynos the son of Eurypylus named a city after him in gratitude for a favour. These mythic connections seem to be late and are not attested before the 3rd century BC. Pergamus' role remained subordinate, although he did receive some cult worship. Beginning in the Roman period, his image appears on civic coinage and he is said to have had a heroon in the city. Even so, he provided a further, deliberately crafted link to the world of Homeric epic. Mithridates VI was celebrated in the city as a new Pergamus.

However, for the Attalids, it was apparently the genealogical connection to Heracles that was crucial, since all the other Hellenistic dynasties had long established such links: the Ptolemies derived themselves directly from Heracles, the Antigonids inserted Heracles into their family tree in the reign of Philip V at the end of the 3rd century BC at the latest, and the Seleucids claimed descent from Apollo. All of these claims derive their significance from Alexander the Great, who claimed descent from Heracles, through his father Philip II.

In their constructive adaptation of the myth, the Attalids stood within the tradition of the other, older Hellenistic dynasties, who legitimized themselves through divine descent, and sought to increase their own prestige. The inhabitants of Pergamon enthusiastically followed their lead and took to calling themselves Telephidai (Τηλεφίδαι) and referring to Pergamon itself in poetic registers as the 'Telephian city' (Τήλεφις πόλις).

== History of research and excavation ==
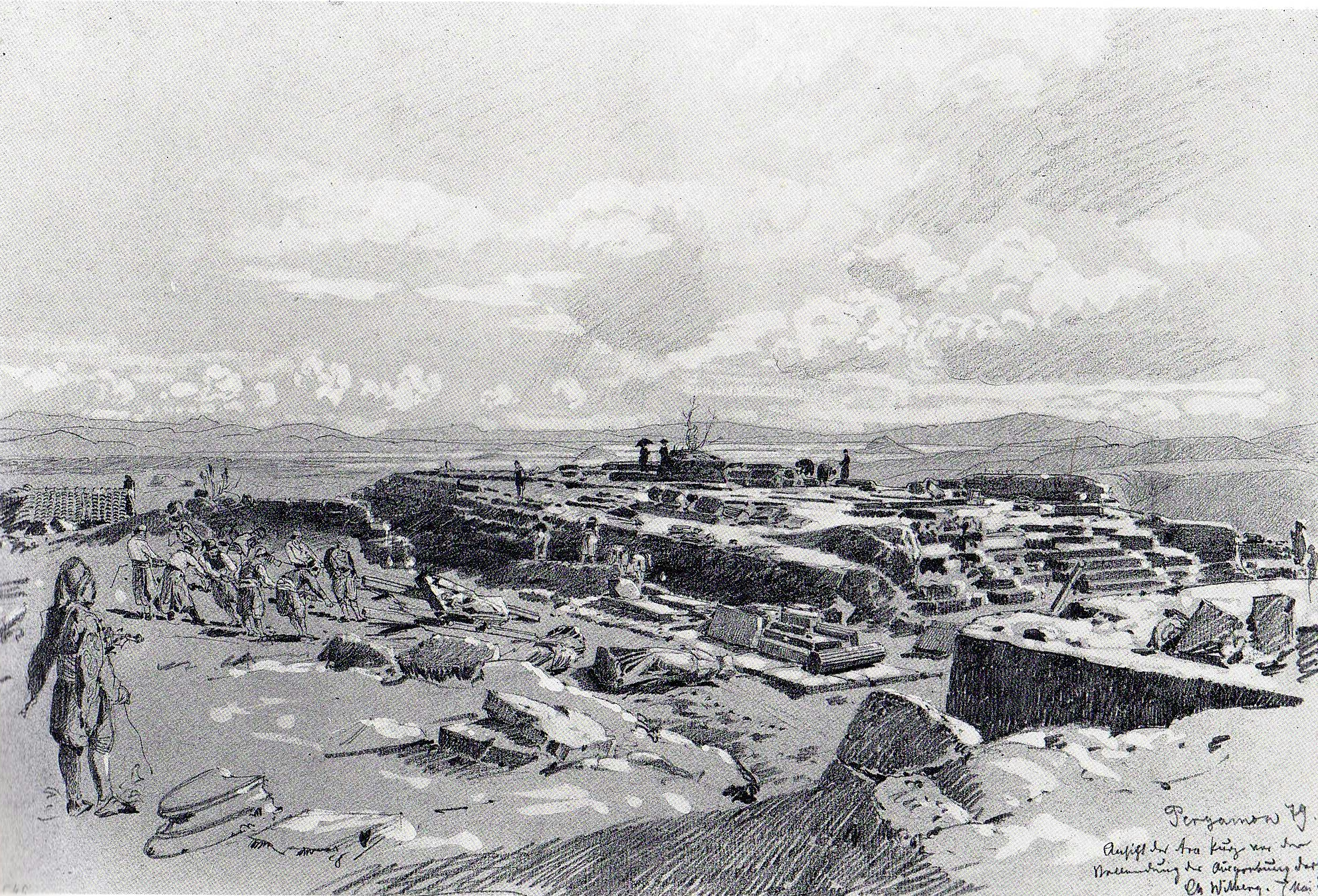
Christian Wilberg: Excavation area of the Pergamon Altar. 1879 sketch.

The first mention of Pergamon in written records after ancient times comes from the 13th century. Beginning with Ciriaco de' Pizzicolli in the 15th century, ever more travellers visited the place and published their accounts of it. The key description is that of Thomas Smith, who visited the Levant in 1668 and transmitted a detailed description of Pergamon, to which the great 17th century travellers Jacob Spon and George Wheler were able to add nothing significant in their own accounts.

In the late 18th century, these visits were reinforced by a scholarly (especially ancient historical) desire for research, epitomised by Marie-Gabriel-Florent-Auguste de Choiseul-Gouffier, a traveller in Asia Minor and French ambassador to the Sublime Porte in Istanbul from 1784 to 1791. At the beginning of the 19th century, Charles Robert Cockerell produced a detailed account and Otto Magnus von Stackelberg made important sketches. A proper, multi-page description with plans, elevations, and views of the city and its ruins was first produced by Charles Texier when he published the second volume of his Description de l'Asie mineure.

In 1864–5, the German engineer Carl Humann visited Pergamon for the first time. For the construction of the road from Pergamon to Dikili for which he had undertaken planning work and topographical studies, he returned in 1869 and began to focus intensively on the legacy of the city. In 1871, he organised a small expedition there under the leadership of Ernst Curtius. As a result of this short but intensive investigation, two fragments of a great frieze were discovered and transported to Berlin for detailed analysis, where they received some interest, but not a lot. It is not clear who connected these fragments with the Great Altar in Pergamon mentioned by Lucius Ampelius. However, when the archaeologist Alexander Conze took over direction of the department of ancient sculpture at the Royal Museums of Berlin, he quickly initiated a programme for the excavation and protection of the monuments connected to the sculpture, which were widely suspected to include the Great Altar.

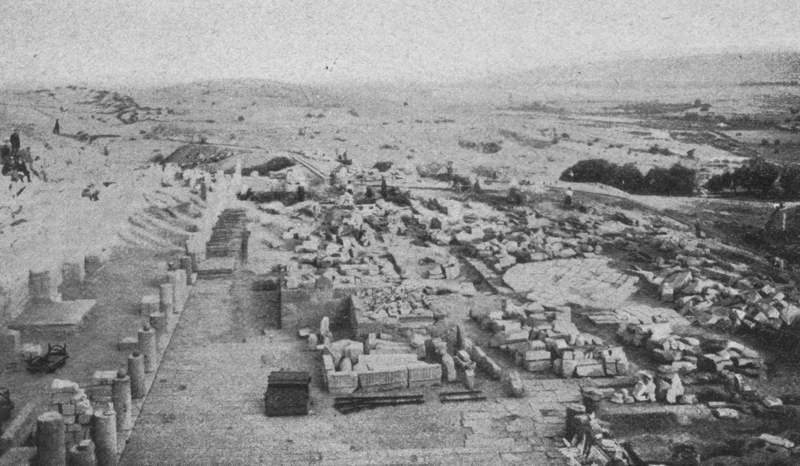
The lower agora in 1902, during excavations

As a result of these efforts, Carl Humann, who had been carrying out low-level excavations at Pergamon for the previous few years and had discovered for example the architrave inscription of the Temple of Demeter in 1875, was entrusted with carry out work in the area of the altar of Zeus in 1878, where he continued to work until 1886. With the approval of the Ottoman Empire, the reliefs discovered there were transported to Berlin, where the Pergamon Museum was opened for them in 1907. The work was continued by Conze, who aimed for the most complete possible exposure and investigation of the historic city and citadel that was possible. He was followed by the architectural historian Wilhelm Dörpfeld from 1900 to 1911, who was responsible for the most important discoveries. Under his leadership the Lower Agora, the House of Attalos, the Gymnasion, and the Sanctuary of Demeter were brought to light.

The excavations were interrupted by the First World War and were only resumed in 1927 under the leadership of Theodor Wiegand, who remained in this post until 1939. He concentrated on further excavation of the upper city, the Asklepieion, and the Red Basilica. The Second World War also caused a break in work at Pergamon, which lasted until 1957. From 1957 to 1968, Erich Boehringer worked on the Asklepieion in particular, but also carried out important work on the lower city as a whole and performed survey work, which increased knowledge of the countryside surrounding the city. In 1971, after a short pause, Wolfgang Radt succeeded him as leader of excavations and directed the focus of research on the residential buildings of Pergamon, but also on technical issues, like the water management system of the city which supported a population of 200,000 at its height. He also carried out conservation projects which were of vital importance for maintaining the material remains of Pergamon. Since 2006, the excavations have been led by Felix Pirson.

Most of the finds from the Pergamon excavations before the First World War were taken to the Pergamon Museum in Berlin, with a smaller portion going to the İstanbul Archaeological Museum after it was opened in 1891. After the First World War the Bergama Museum was opened, which has received all finds discovered since then.

In May 2022, archaeologists announced the discovery of a 1,800-year-old well-preserved geometric patterned floor mosaic around the Red Basilica.

== Main sights ==
=== Upper Acropolis ===
==== Pergamon Altar ====
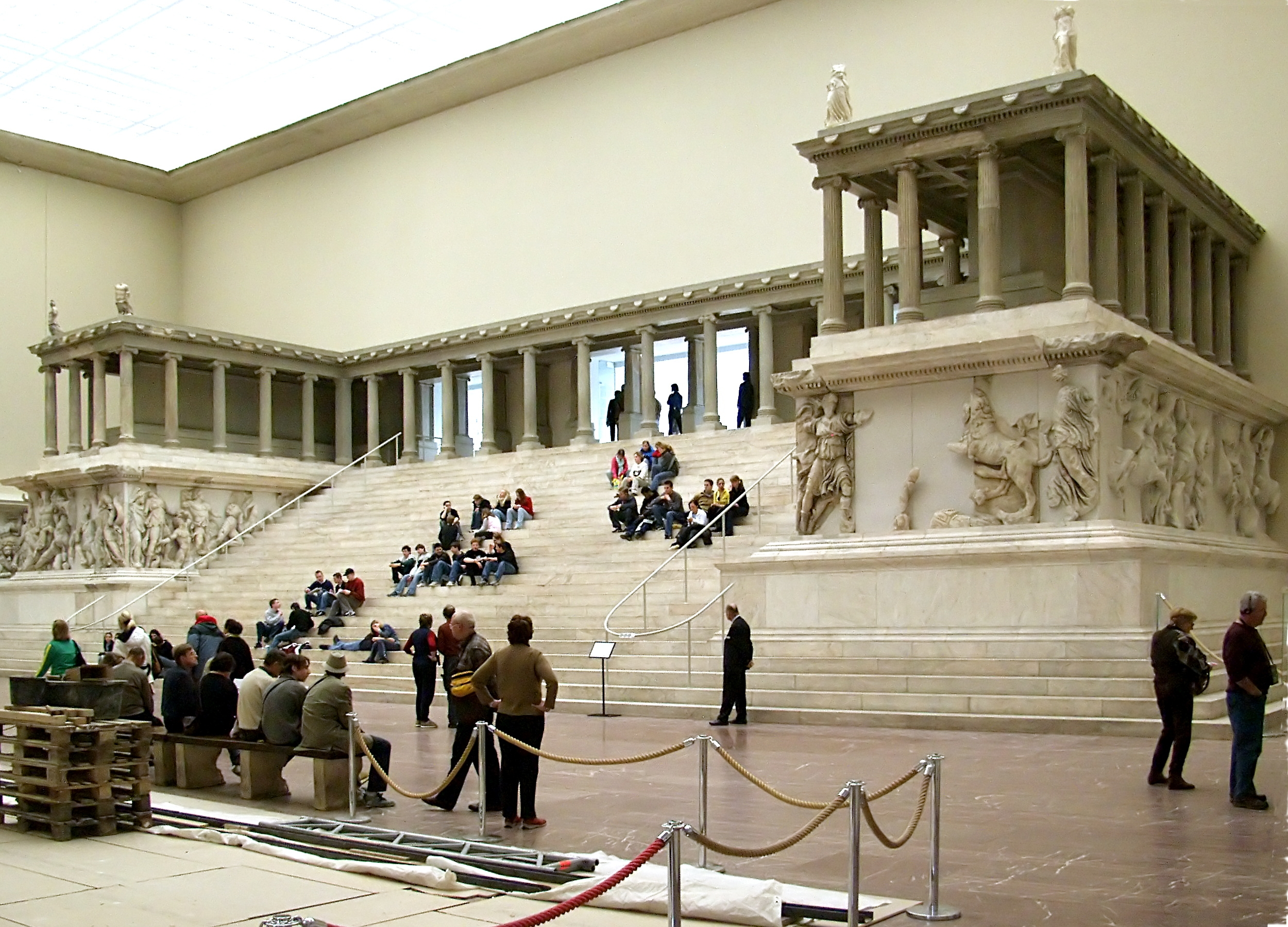
The Great Altar of Pergamon, on display in the Pergamon Museum in Berlin, Germany

The most famous structure from the city is the monumental altar, sometimes called the Great Altar, which was probably dedicated to Zeus and Athena. The foundations are still located in the Upper city, but the remains of the Pergamon frieze, which originally decorated it, are displayed in the Pergamon museum in Berlin, where the parts of the frieze taken to Germany have been installed in a partial reconstruction.

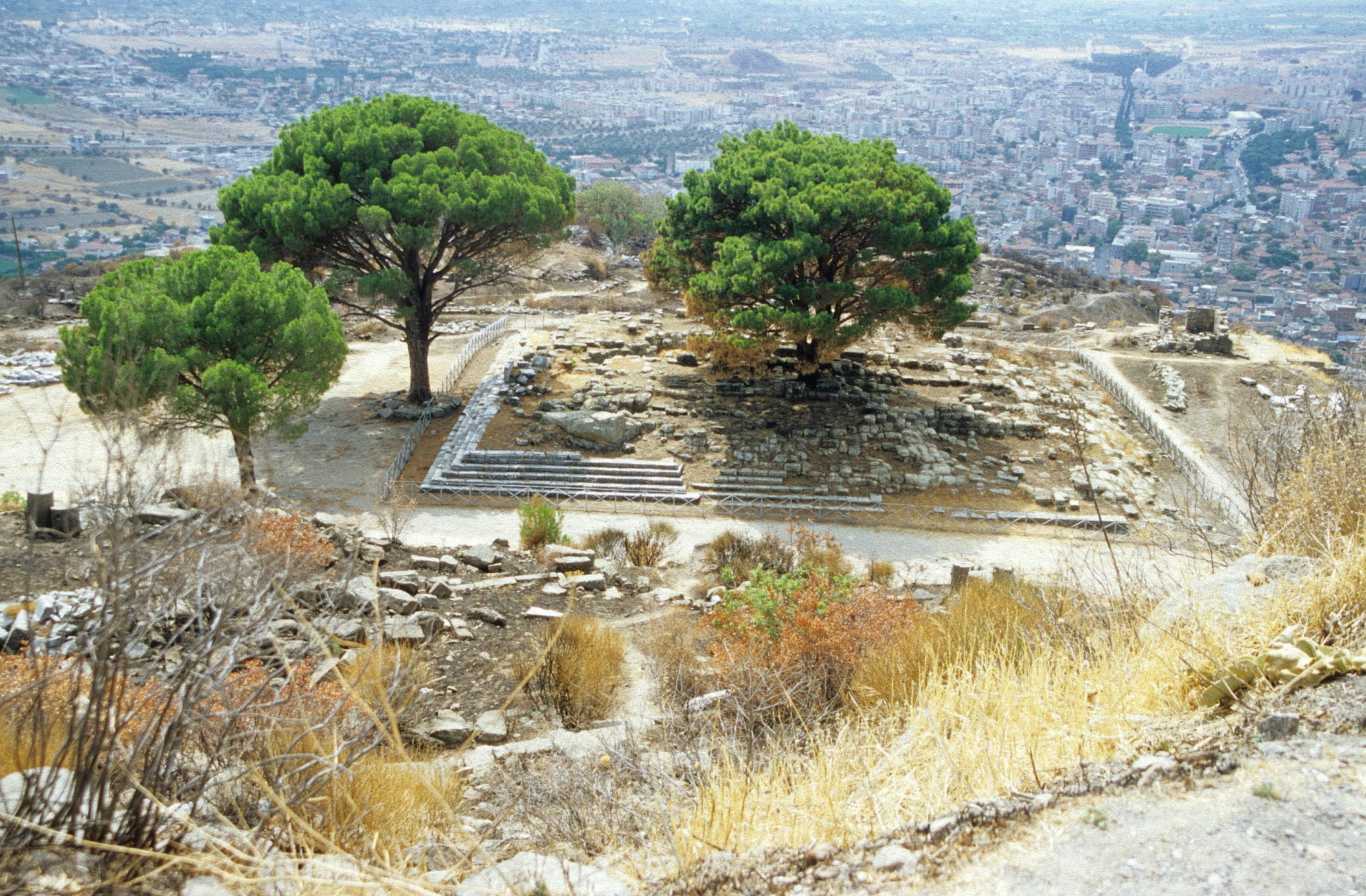
Foundations of the Pergamon altar

For the altar's construction, the required flat area was skillfully created through terracing, in order to allow it to be oriented in relation to the neighbouring Temple of Athena. The base of the altar measured around 36 x 33 metres and was decorated on the outside with a detailed depiction in high relief of the Gigantomachy, the battle between the Olympian gods and the Giants. The frieze is 2.30 metres high and has a total length of 113 metres, making it the second longest frieze surviving from antiquity, after the Parthenon Frieze in Athens. A 20-metre-wide (66 ft) staircase cut into the base on the western side leads up to the upper structure, which is surrounded by a colonnade, and consists of a colonnaded courtyard, separated from the staircase by a colonnade. The interior walls of this colonnade had a further frieze, depicting the life of Telephus, the son of Heracles and mythical founder of Pergamon. This frieze is around 1.60 metres high and thus is clearly smaller than the outer frieze.

In the New Testament Book of Revelation, the faith of the Pergamon believers, who "dwell where Satan's throne is" is commended by the author. Many scholars believe that the "seat of Satan" refers to the Pergamon Altar, due to its resemblance to a gigantic throne.

==== Theatre ====
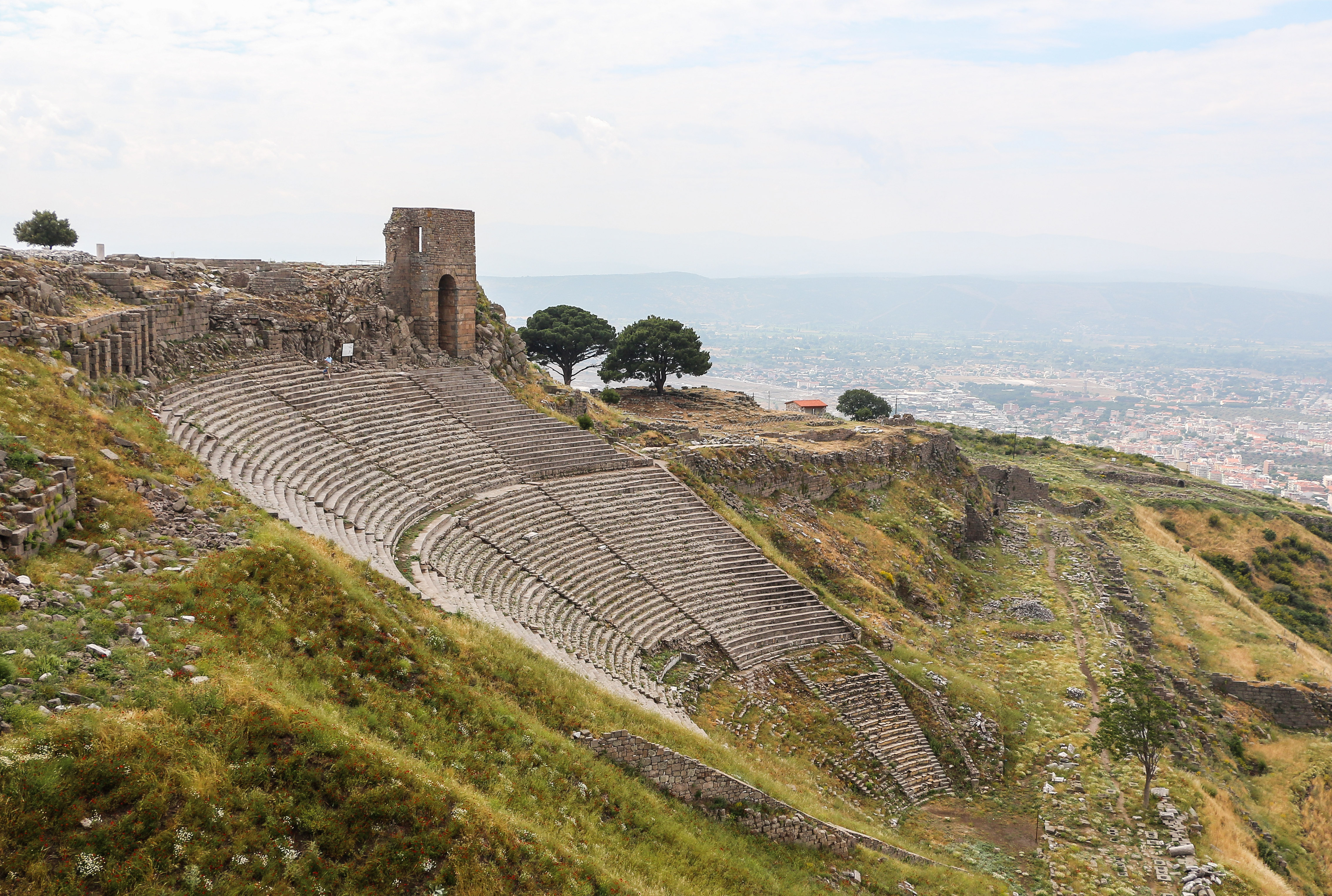
Theatre of Pergamon, one of the steepest theatres in the world, has a capacity of 10,000 people and was constructed in the 3rd century BC.

The well-preserved Theatre of Pergamon dates from the Hellenistic period and had space for around 10,000 people, in 78 rows of seats. At a height of 36 metres, it is the steepest of all ancient theatres. The seating area (koilon) is divided horizontally by two walkways, called diazomata, and vertically by 0.75-metre-wide (2.5 ft) stairways into seven sections in the lowest part of the theatre and six in the middle and upper sections. Below the theatre is a 247-metre-long (810 ft) and up to 17.4-metre-wide (57 ft) terrace, which rested on a high retaining wall and was framed on the long side by a stoa. Coming from the Upper market, one could enter this from a tower-building at the south end. This terrace had no space for the circular orchestra, which was normal in a Greek theatre, so only a wooden stage building was built which could be taken down when there was no performance taking place. Thus, the view along the terrace to the Temple of Dionysos at the northern end was unimpeded. A marble stage building was only built in the 1st century BC. Additional theatres were built in the Roman period, one in the Roman new city and the other in the sanctuary of Asclepius.

==== Temple of Trajan (Traianeum) ====
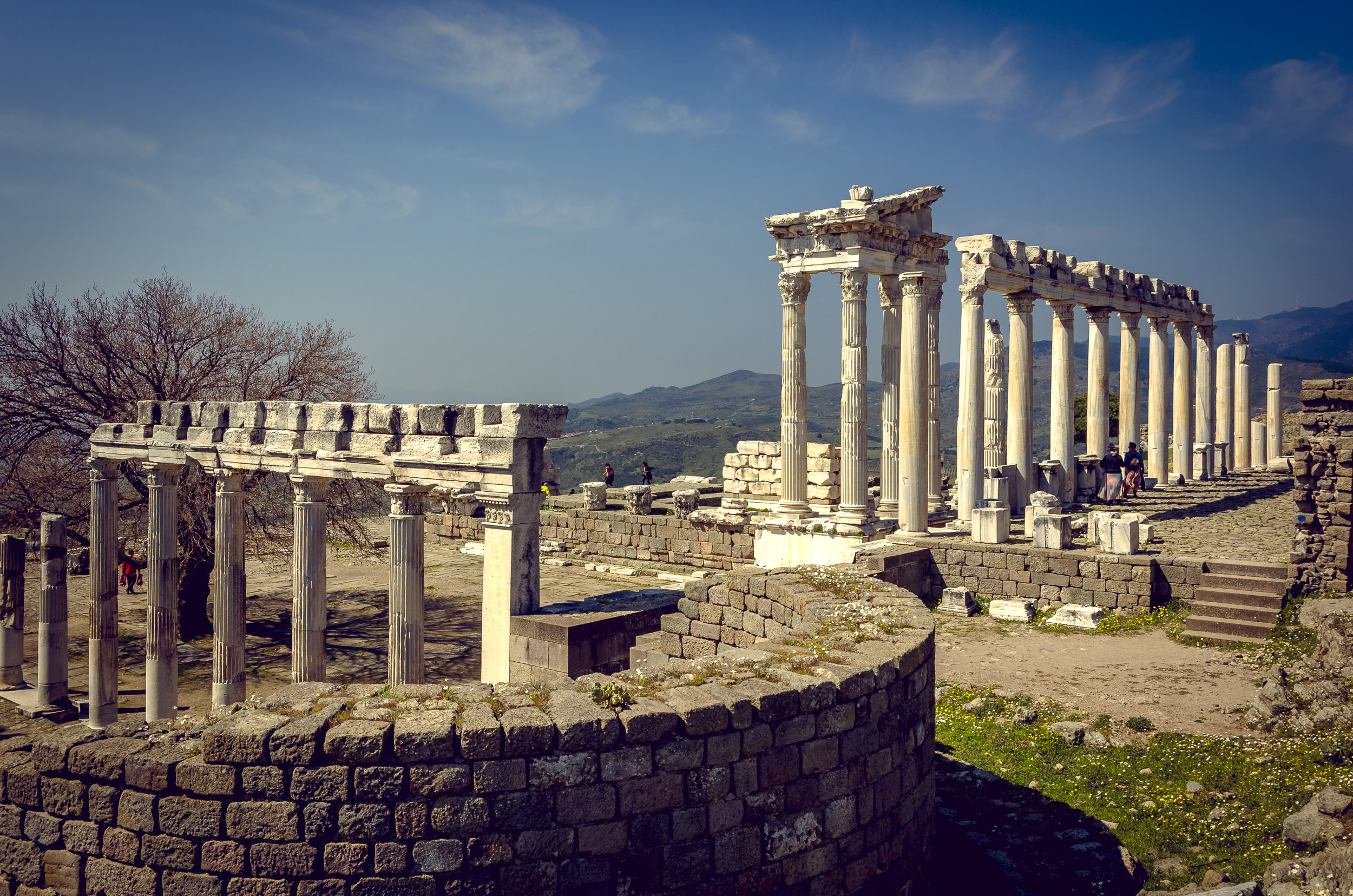
The Traianeum

On the highest point of the citadel is the Temple of Trajan, the Traianeum or Trajaneum. The Temple is also called the Temple of Zeus Philios, as both Zeus and Trajan were worshiped in the Temple, the former sharing it with the latter. The temple sits on a 2.9-metre-high (9.5 ft) podium on top of a vaulted terrace. The temple itself was a Corinthian peripteros temple, about 18 metres wide with six columns on the short sides and nine columns on the long sides, and two rows of columns in antis. To the north, the area was closed off by a high stoa, while on the west and east sides it was surrounded by simple ashlar walls, until further stoas were inserted in Hadrian's reign.

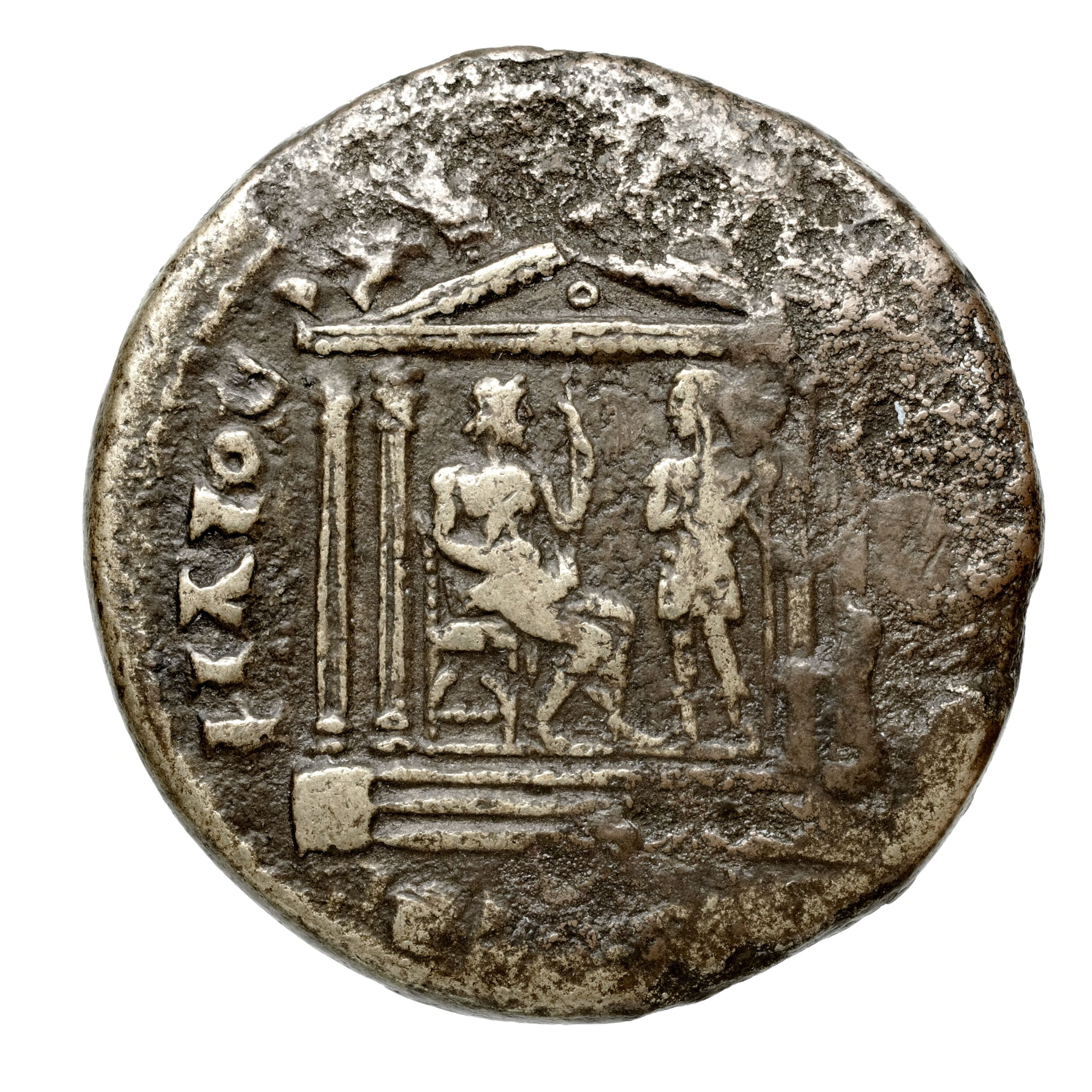
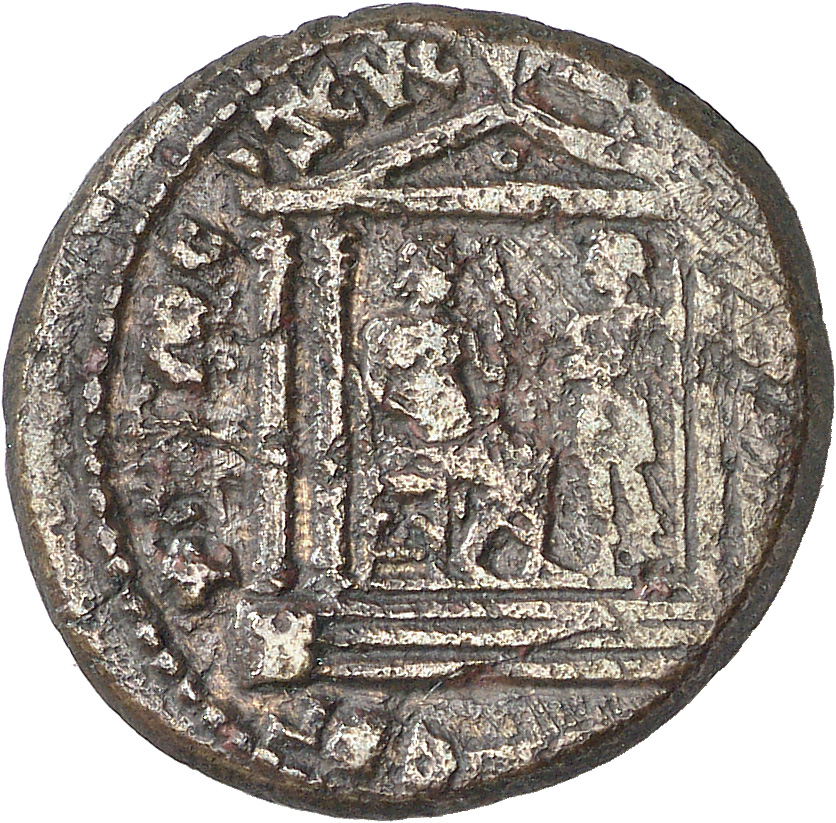
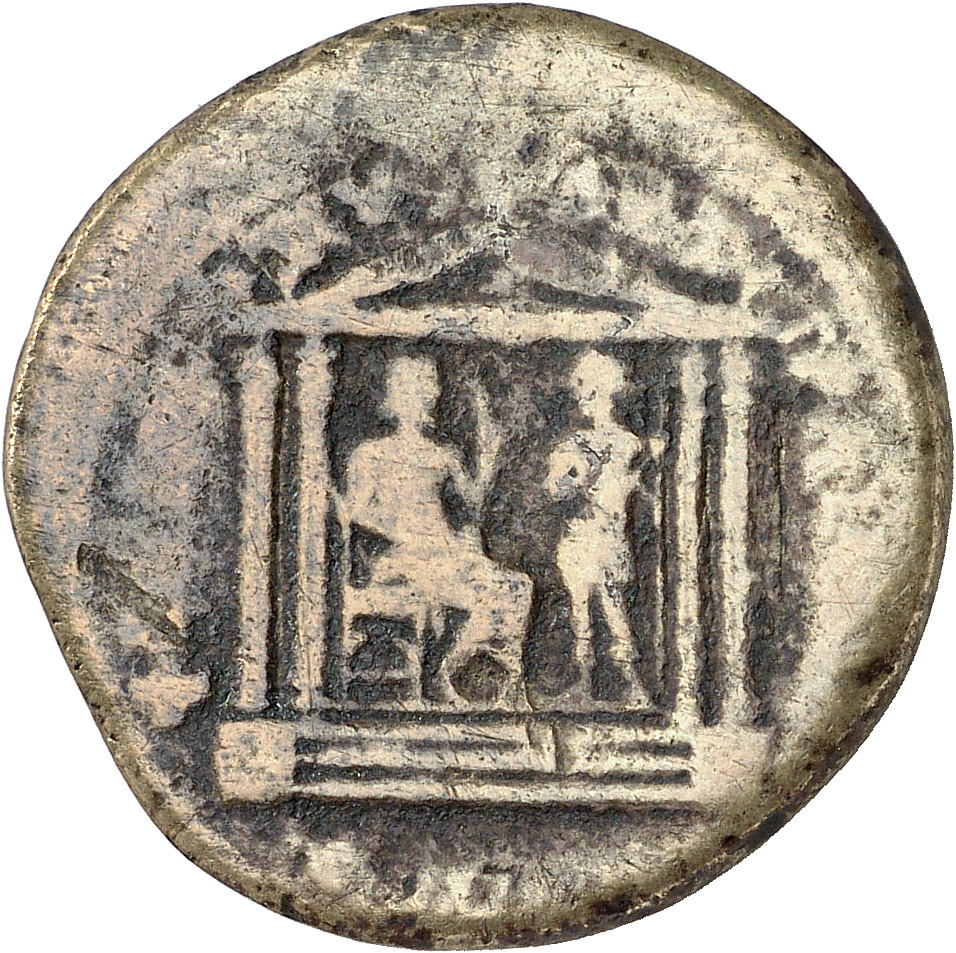
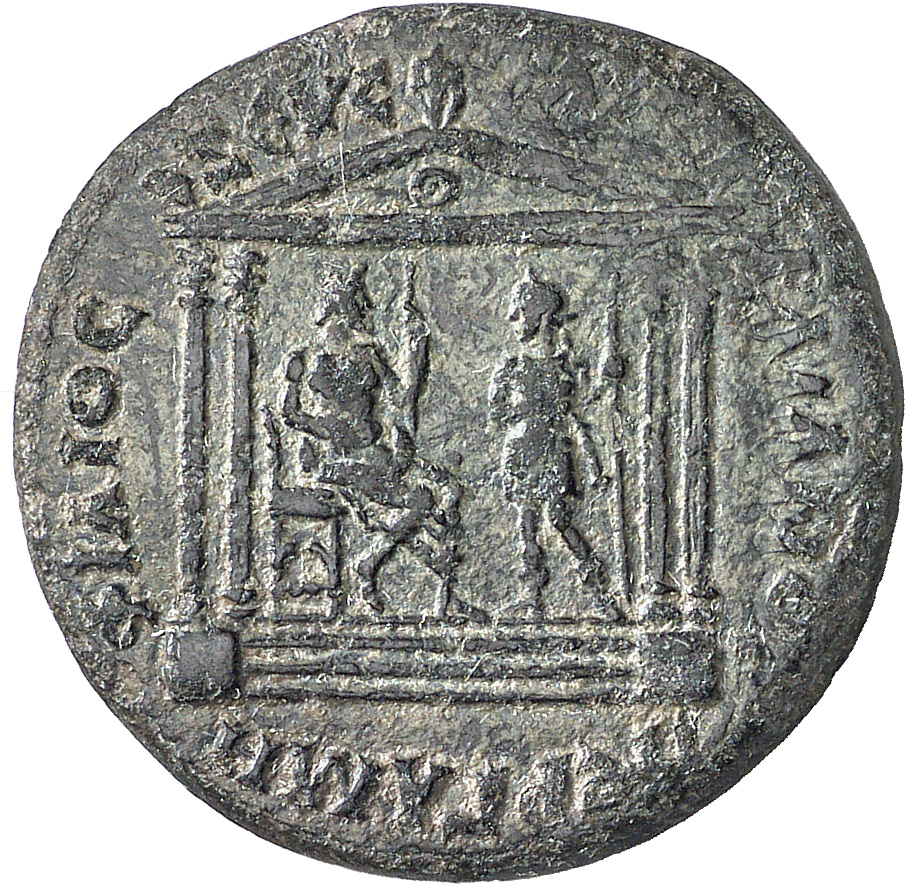
Provincial coins minted in Pergamon depicting Trajan sharing a temple with Zeus Philios

During the excavations fragments of statues of Trajan and Hadrian were found in the rubble of the cella, including their portrait heads, as well as fragments of the cult statue of Zeus Philios.

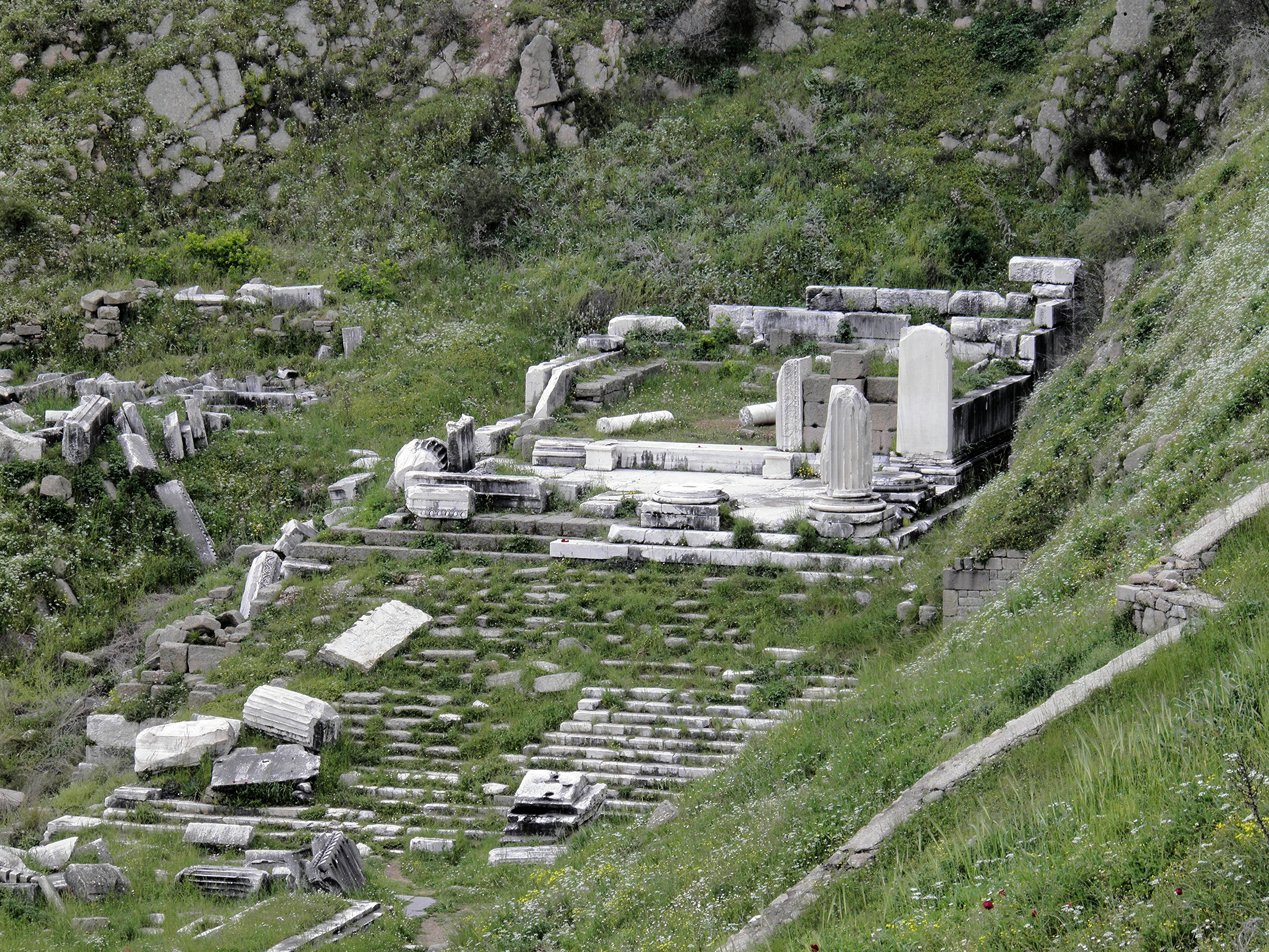
Sanctuary of Dionysus at the north end of the theatre terrace

==== Temple of Dionysus ====
At Pergamon, Dionysus had the epithet Kathegemon, 'the guide', and was already worshiped in the last third of the 3rd century BC, when the Attalids made him the chief god of their dynasty. In the 2nd century BC, Eumenes II (probably) built a temple for Dionysus at the northern end of the theatre terrace. The marble temple sits on a podium, 4.5 metres above the level of the theatre terrace and was an Ionic prostyle temple. The pronaos was four columns wide and two columns deep and was accessed by a staircase of twenty-five steps. Only a few traces of the Hellenistic structure survive. The majority of the surviving structure derives from a reconstruction of the temple which probably took place under Caracalla, or perhaps under Hadrian.

==== Temple of Athena ====
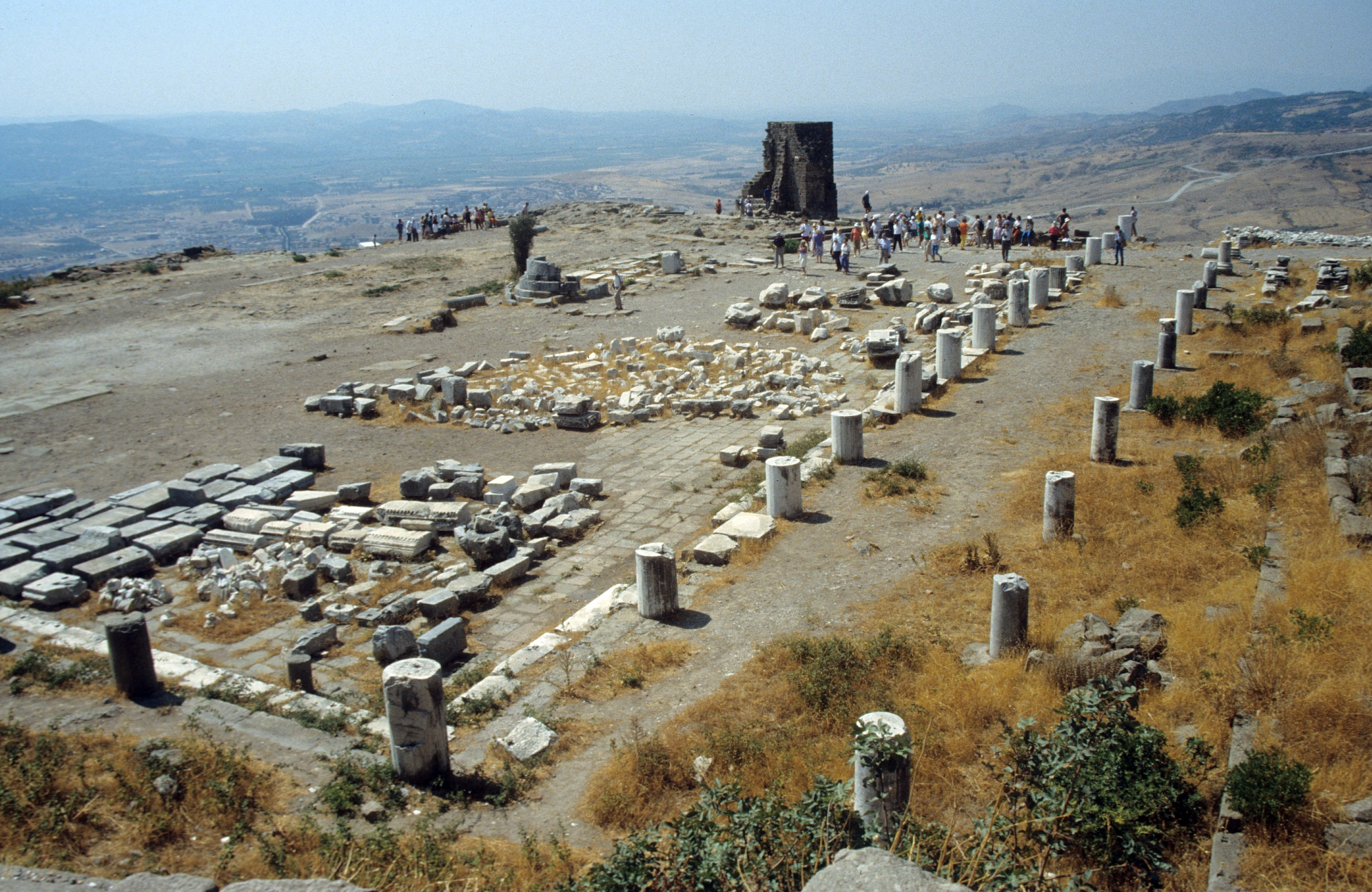
Temple of Athena

Pergamon's oldest temple is a sanctuary of Athena from the 4th century BC. It was a north-facing Doric peripteros temple with six columns on the short side and ten on the long side and a cella divided into two rooms. The foundations, measuring around 12.70 x 21.80 metres, are still visible today. The columns were around 5.25 metres high, 0.75 metres in diameter, and the distance between the columns was 1.62 metres, so the colonnade was very light for a temple of this period. This is matched by the shape of the triglyphs, which usually consist of a sequence of two triglyphs and two metopes, but are instead composed of three of triglyphs and three metopes. The columns of the temple are unfluted and retained bossage, but it is not clear whether this was a result of carelessness or incompleteness.

A two-story stoa surrounding the temple on three sides was added under Eumenes II, along with the propylon in the southeast corner, which is now found, largely reconstructed, in the Pergamon Museum in Berlin. The balustrade of the upper level of the north and east stoas was decorated with reliefs depicting weapons which commemorated Eumenes II's military victory. The construction mixed Ionic columns and Doric triglyphs (of which five triglyphs and metopes survive). In the area of the sanctuary, Attalos I and Eumenes II constructed victory monuments, most notably the Gallic dedications. The northern stoa seems to have been the site of the Library of Pergamon.

==== Library ====
The Library of Pergamon was the second largest in the ancient Greek world after the Library of Alexandria, containing at least 200,000 scrolls. The location of the library building is not certain. Since the 19th century excavations, it has generally been identified with an annex of the northern stoa of the sanctuary of Athena in the Upper Citadel, which was built by Eumenes II. Inscriptions in the gymnasium which mention a library might indicate, however, that the building was located in that area.

==== Other structures ====
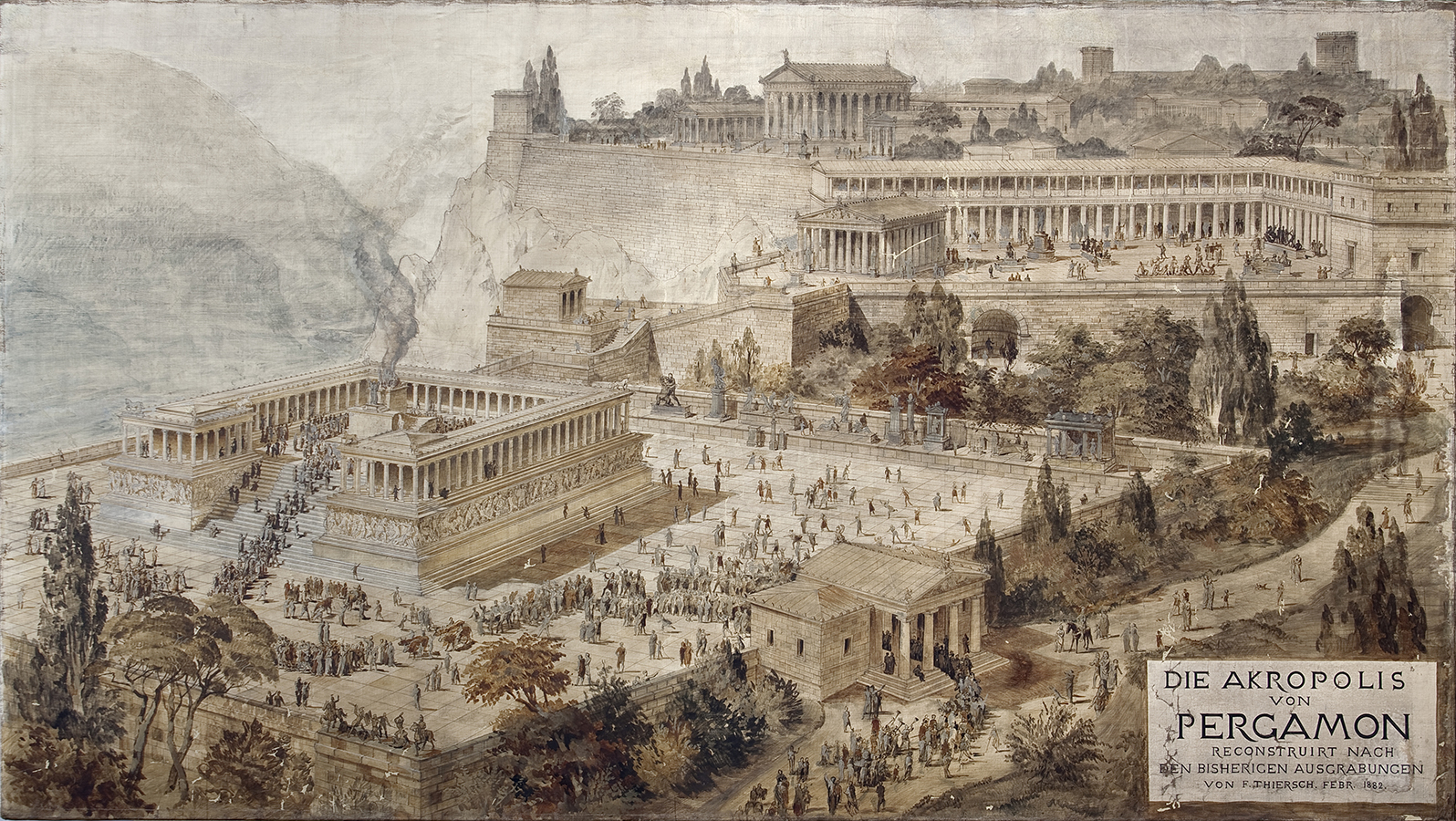
Reconstructed view of the Pergamon Acropolis, Friedrich Thierch, 1882

Other notable structures still in existence on the upper part of the Acropolis include:

- The Royal palaces
- The Heroön – a shrine where the kings of Pergamon, particularly Attalus I and Eumenes II, were worshipped.
- The Upper Agora
- The Roman baths complex
- Diodorus Pasporos heroon
- Arsenals

The site is today easily accessible by the Bergama Acropolis Gondola from the base station in northeastern Bergama.

=== Lower Acropolis ===
==== Gymnasium ====
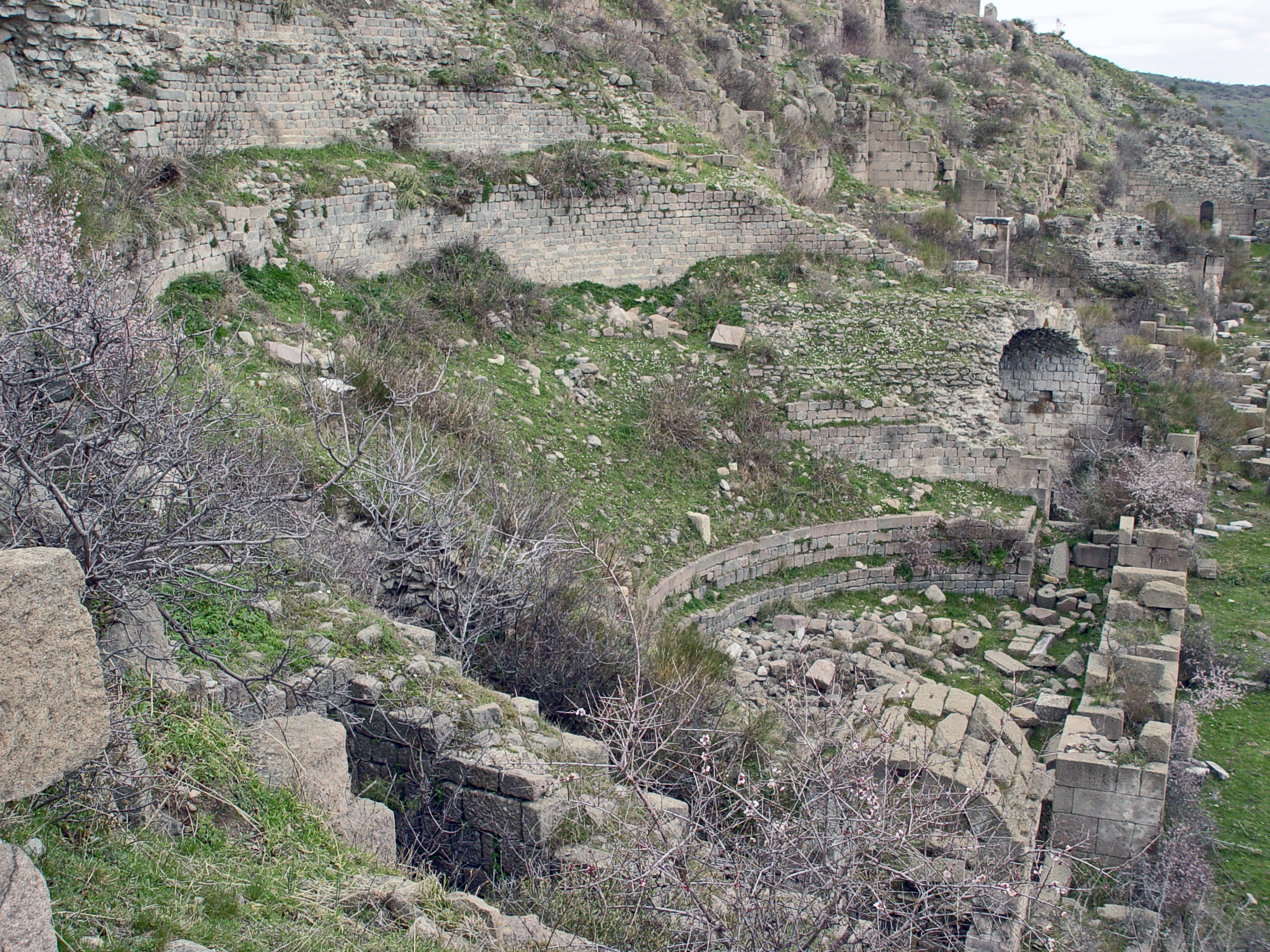
Gymnasium area near Upper Terrace

A large gymnasium area was built in the 2nd century BC on the south side of the Acropolis. It consisted of three terraces, with the main entrance at the southeast corner of the lowest terrace. The lowest and southernmost terrace is small and almost free of buildings. It is known as the Lower Gymnasium and has been identified as the boys' gymnasium. The middle terrace was around 250 metres long and 70 metres wide at the centre. On its north side there was a two-story hall. In the east part of the terrace there was a small prostyle temple in the Corinthian order. A roofed stadium, known as the Basement Stadium is located between the middle terrace and the upper terrace.

The upper terrace measured 150 x 70 metres square, making it the largest of the three terraces. It consisted of a courtyard surrounded by stoas and other structures, measuring roughly 36 x 74 metres. This complex is identified as a palaestra and had a theatre-shaped lecture hall beyond the northern stoa, which is probably of Roman date and a large banquet hall in the centre. Further rooms of uncertain function were accessible from the stoas. In the west was a south-facing Ionic antae temple, the central sanctuary of the gymnasium. The eastern area was replaced with a bath complex in Roman times. Further Roman baths were constructed to the west of the Ionic temple.

==== Sanctuary of Hera ====
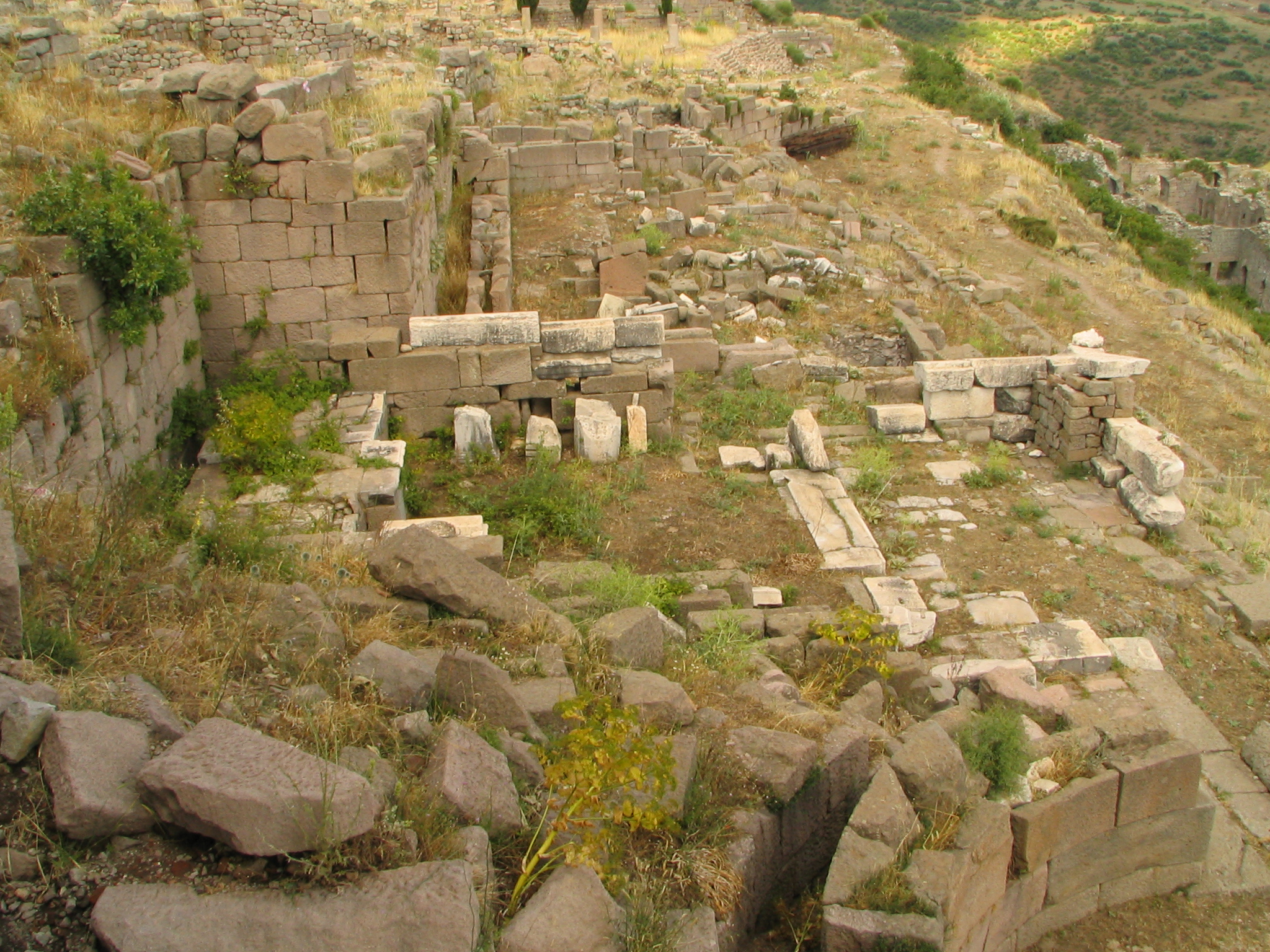
Temple and sanctuary of Hera from the west

The sanctuary of Hera Basileia ('the Queen') lay north of the upper terrace of the gymnasium. Its structure sits on two parallel terraces, the south one about 107.4 metres above sea level and the north one about 109.8 metres above sea level. The Temple of Hera sat in the middle of the upper terrace, facing to the south, with a 6-metre-wide (20 ft) exedra to the west and a building whose function is very unclear to the east. The two terraces were linked by a staircase of eleven steps around 7.5 metres wide, descending from the front of the temple.

The temple was about 7 metres wide by 12 metres long, and sat on a three-stepped foundation. It was a Doric tetrastyle prostyle temple, with three triglyphs and metopes for each span in the entablature. All the other buildings in the sanctuary were made out of trachyte, but the visible part of the temple was made of marble, or at least had a marble cladding. The base of the cult image inside the cella supported three cult statues.

The surviving remains of the inscription on the architrave indicate that the building was the temple of Hera Basileia and that it was erected by Attalus II.

==== Sanctuary of Demeter ====
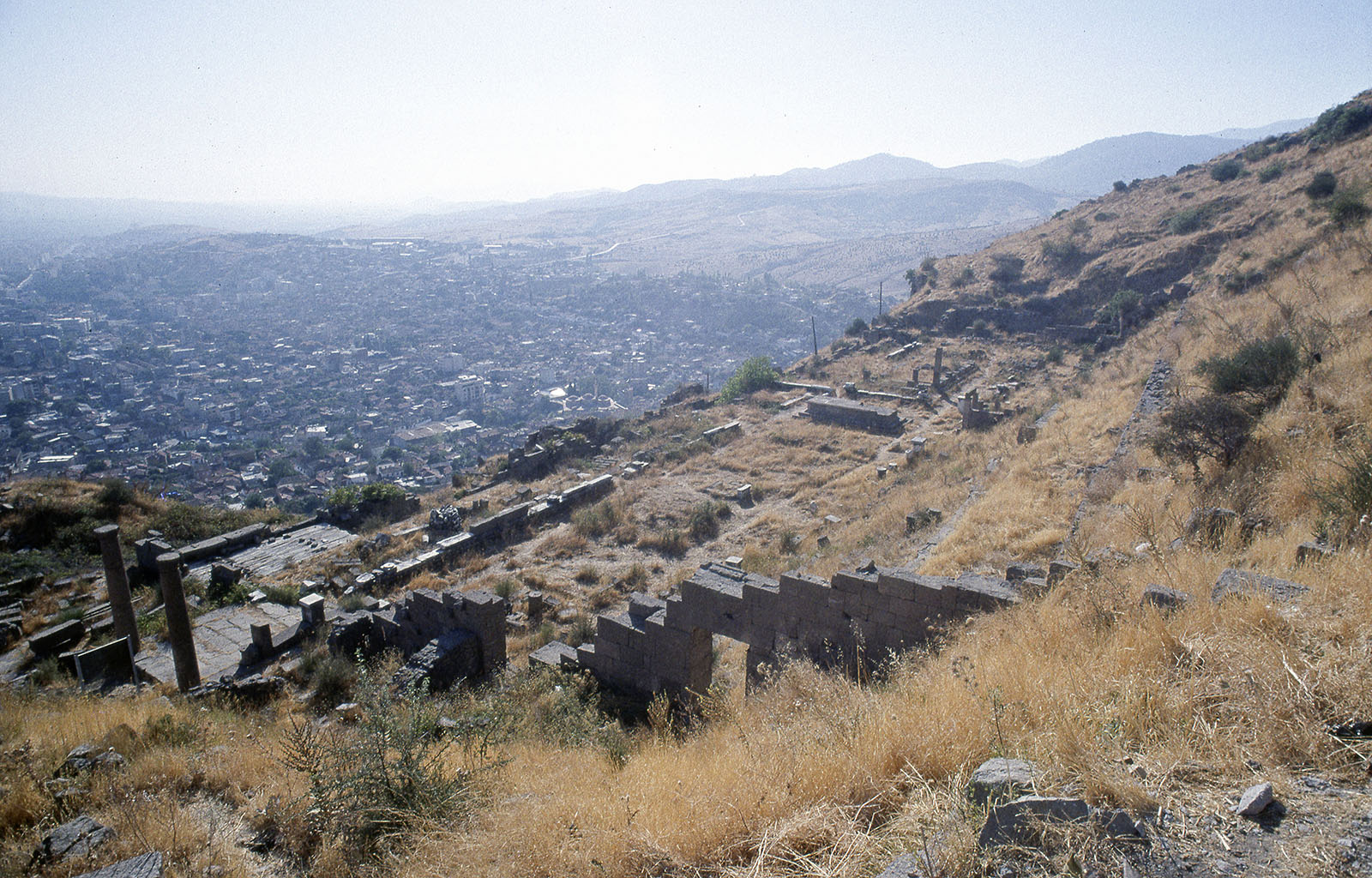
Sanctuary of Demeter from the east

The Sanctuary of Demeter occupied an area of 50 x 110 metres on the middle level of the south slope of the citadel. The sanctuary was old; its activity can be traced back to the fourth century BC.

The sanctuary was entered through a Propylon from the east, which led to a courtyard surrounded by stoas on three sides. In the centre of the western half of this courtyard, stood the Ionic temple of Demeter, a straightforward Antae temple, measuring 6.45 x 12.7 metres, with a porch in the Corinthian order which was added in the time of Antoninus Pius. The rest of the structure was of Hellenistic date, built in local marble and had a marble frieze decorated with bucrania. About 9.5 metres in front of the east-facing building, there was an altar, which was 7 metres long and 2.3 metres wide. The temple and the altar were built for Demeter by Philetaerus, his brother Eumenes, and their mother Boa.

In the east part of the courtyard, there were more than ten rows of seating laid out in front of the northern stoa for participants in the mysteries of Demeter. Roughly 800 initiates could fit in these seats.

==== Other structures ====
The lower part of the Acropolis also contains the following structures:

- the House of Attalus
- the Lower Agora and
- the Gate of Eumenes

=== At the foot of the Acropolis ===
==== Sanctuary of Asclepius (Asclepieion) ====
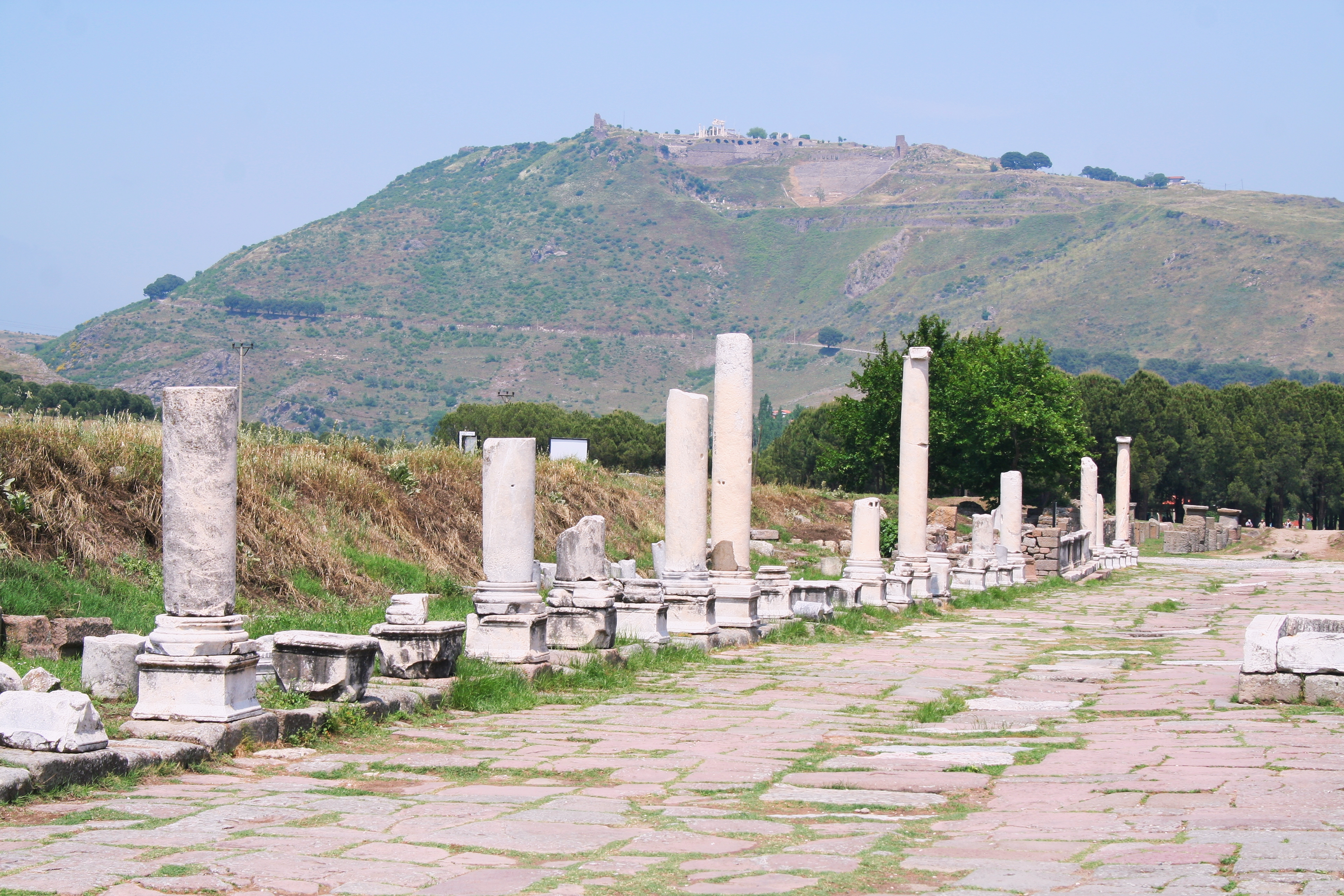
View of Acropolis from the Sanctuary of Asclepius

Three kilometres (1.9 miles) south of the Acropolis (at 39° 7′ 9″ N, 27° 9′ 56″ E), down in the valley, is the Sanctuary of Asclepius, the god of healing. The Sanctuary of Asclepius, more commonly left untranslated Asclepieion (from Greek), or sometimes Asclepium (from Latin), was approached along an 820-metre (2,690 ft) colonnaded sacred way. In this place people with health problems could bathe in the water of the sacred spring, and in the patients' dreams Asclepius would appear in a vision to tell them how to cure their illness. Archeology has found many gifts and dedications that people would make afterwards, such as small terracotta body parts, no doubt representing what had been healed. Galen, the most famous doctor in the ancient Roman Empire and personal physician of Emperor Marcus Aurelius, worked in the Asclepieion for many years.

Notable extant structures in the Asclepieion include:

- the Roman theater
- the North Stoa
- the South Stoa
- the Temple of Asclepius
  - in some sources, referred to as the Temple of Zeus Asclepius, or the Temple of Zeus Asclepius Soter ("Soter" being an epithet meaning "savior"), since there is evidence that L. Cuspius Pactumeius Rufinus, who constructed the temple, dedicated it to this new syncretic god
- a circular treatment center (sometimes known as the Temple of Telesphorus)
- a healing spring
- an underground passageway
- a library
- the Via Tecta (or the Sacred Way, which is a colonnaded street leading to the sanctuary)
- a propylon

==== Serapis Temple ====
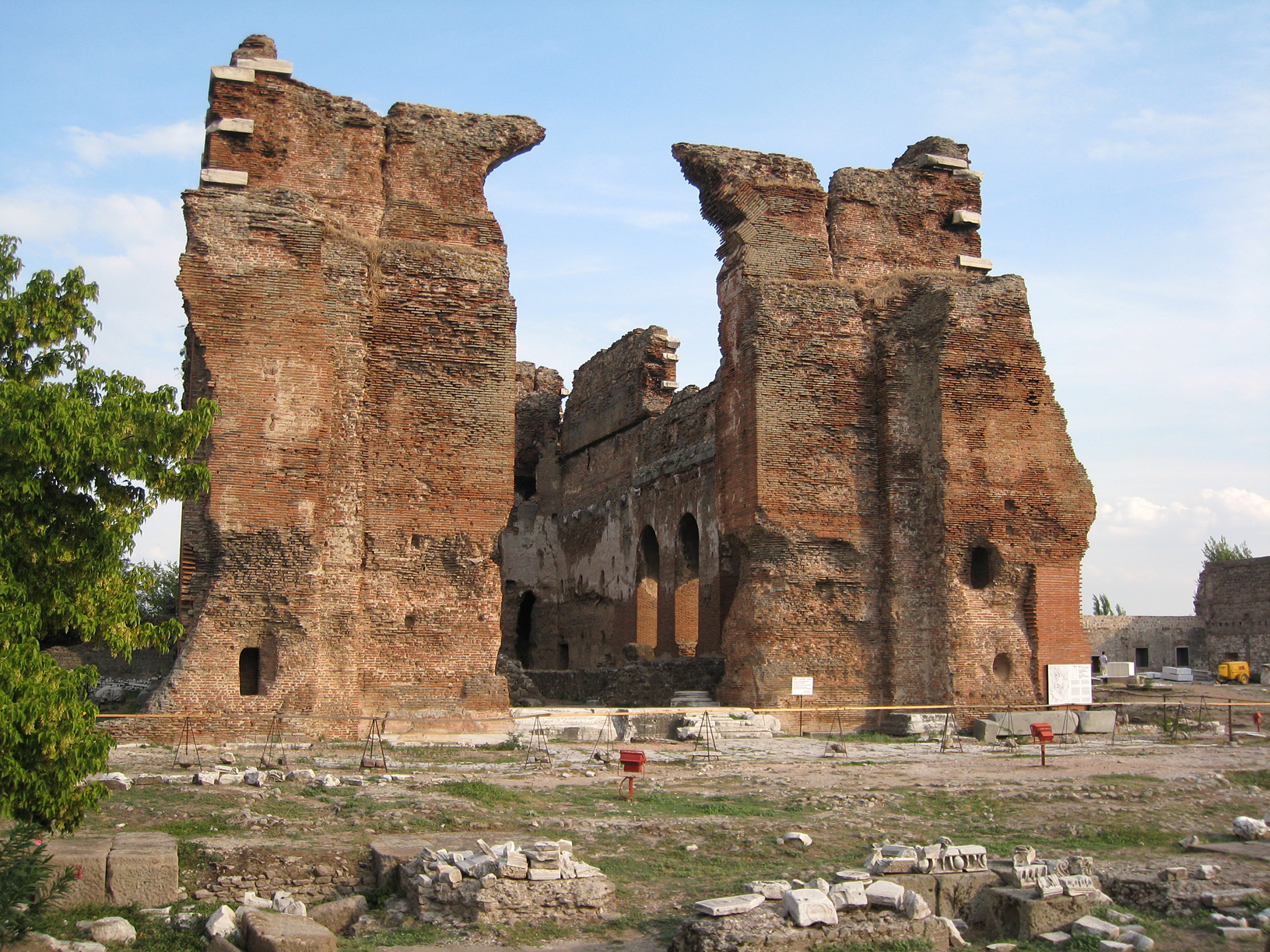
The Red Basilica

Pergamon's other notable structure is the great temple of the Egyptian gods Isis and/or Serapis, known today as the Red Basilica (or Kızıl Avlu in Turkish), about one kilometre (0.62 miles) south of the Acropolis at (39 7' 19" N, 27 11' 1" E). It consists of a main building and two round towers within an enormous temenos or sacred area. The temple towers flanking the main building had courtyards with pools used for ablutions at each end, flanked by stoas on three sides. The forecourt of the Temple of Isis/Sarapis is still supported by the 193-metre-wide (633-foot) Pergamon Bridge, the largest bridge substruction of antiquity.

According to Christian tradition, in the year 92 Saint Antipas, the first bishop of Pergamum ordained by John the Apostle, was a victim of an early clash between Serapis worshippers and Christians. An angry mob is said to have burned Saint Antipas alive in front of the Temple inside a brazen bull-like incense burner, which represented the bull god Apis. His martyrdom is one of the first recorded in Christian history, highlighted by the Christian Scripture itself through the message sent to the Pergamon Church in the Book of Revelation.

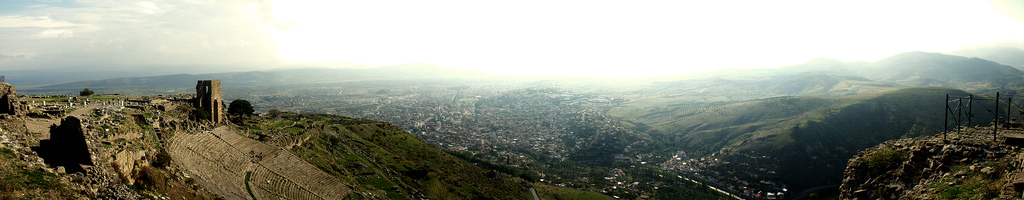
Panoramic view of Pergamon and the modern city of Bergama.

== Infrastructure and housing ==
Pergamon is a good example of a city that expanded in a planned and controlled manner.

Philetairos transformed Pergamon from an archaic settlement into a fortified city. He or his successor Attalos I built a wall around the whole upper city, including the plateau to the south, the upper agora and some of the housing – further housing must have been found outside these walls. Because of the growth of the city, the streets were expanded and the city was monumentalised. Under Attalos I some minor changes were made to the city of Philetairos.

During the reign of Eumenes II and Attalos II, there was a substantial expansion of the city. A new street network was created and a new city wall, with a monumental gatehouse called the Gate of Eumenes, was built south of the Acropolis. The wall, with numerous gates, now surrounded the entire hill, not just the upper city and the flat area to the southwest, all the way to the Selinus river. Numerous public buildings were constructed, as well as a new marketplace south of the acropolis and a new gymnasion in the east. The southeast slope and the whole western slope of the hill were now settled and opened up by streets.

The plan of Pergamon was affected by the extreme steepness of the site. As a result of this, the streets had to turn hairpin corners, so that the hill could be climbed as comfortably and quickly as possible. For the construction of buildings and laying out of the agoras, extensive work on the cliff-face and terracing had to be carried out. A consequence of the city's growth was the construction of new buildings over old ones, since there was not sufficient space.

Separate from this, a new area was laid out in Roman times, consisting of a whole new city west of the Selinus river, with all necessary infrastructure, including baths, theatres, stadiums, and sanctuaries. This Roman new city was able to expand without any city walls constraining it because of the absence of external threats.

=== Housing ===
Generally, most of the Hellenistic houses at Pergamon were laid out with a small, centrally-located and roughly square courtyard, with rooms on one or two sides of it. The main rooms are often stacked in two levels on the north side of the courtyard. A wide passage or colonnade on the north side of the courtyard often opened onto foyers, which enabled access to other rooms. An exact north–south arrangement of the city blocks was not possible because of the topographical situation and earlier construction. Thus the size and arrangement of the rooms differed from house to house. From the time of Philetairos, at the latest, this kind of courtyard house was common and it was ever more widespread as time went on, but not universal. Some complexes were designed as Prostas houses, similar to designs seen at Priene. Others had wide columned halls in front of main rooms to the north. Especially in this latter type there is often a second story accessed by stairways. In the courtyards there were often cisterns, which captured rain water from the sloping roofs above. For the construction under Eumenes II, a city block of 35 x 45 m can be reconstructed, subject to significant variation as a result of the terrain.

=== Open spaces ===
From the beginning of the reign of Philetairos, civic events in Pergamon were concentrated on the Acropolis. Over time the so-called 'Upper agora' was developed at the south end of this. In the reign of Attalos I, a Temple of Zeus was built there. To the north of this structure there was a multi-story building, which propbably had a function connected to the marketplace. With progressive development of the open space, these buildings were demolished, while the Upper Agora itself took on a more strongly commercial function, while still a special space as a result of the temple of Zeus. In the course of the expansion of the city under Eumenes, the commercial character of the Upper Agora was further developed. The key signs of this development are primarily the halls built under Eumenes II, whose back chambers were probably used for trade. In the west, the 'West Chamber' was built which might have served as a market administration building. After these renovations, the Upper Agora thus served as a centre for trade and spectacle in the city.

Because of significant new construction in the immediate vicinity – the renovation of the Sanctuary of Athena and the Pergamon altar and the redesign of the neighbouring area - the design and organisational principle of the Upper Agora underwent a further change. Its character became much more spectacular and focussed on the two new structures looming over it, especially the altar which was visible on its terrace from below since the usual stoa surrounding it was omitted from the design.

The 80 m long and 55 m wide 'Lower Agora' was built under Eumenes II and was not significantly altered until Late Antiquity. As with the Upper Agora, the rectangular form of the agora was adapted to the steep terrain. The construction consisted in total of three levels. Of these the Upper Level and the 'Main Level' opened onto a central courtyard. On the lower level there were rooms only on the south and east sides because of the slope of the land, which led through a colonnade to the exterior of the space. The whole market area extended over two levels with a large columned hall in the centre, which contained small shop spaces and miscellaneous rooms.

=== Streets and bridges ===
The course of the main street, which winds up the hill to the Acropolis with a series of hairpin turns, is typical of the street system of Pergamon. On this street were shops and warehouses. The surface of the street consisted of andesite blocks up to 5 metres wide, 1 metre long and 30 cm deep. The street included a drainage system, which carried the water down the slope. Since it was the most important street of the city, the quality of the material used in its construction was very high.

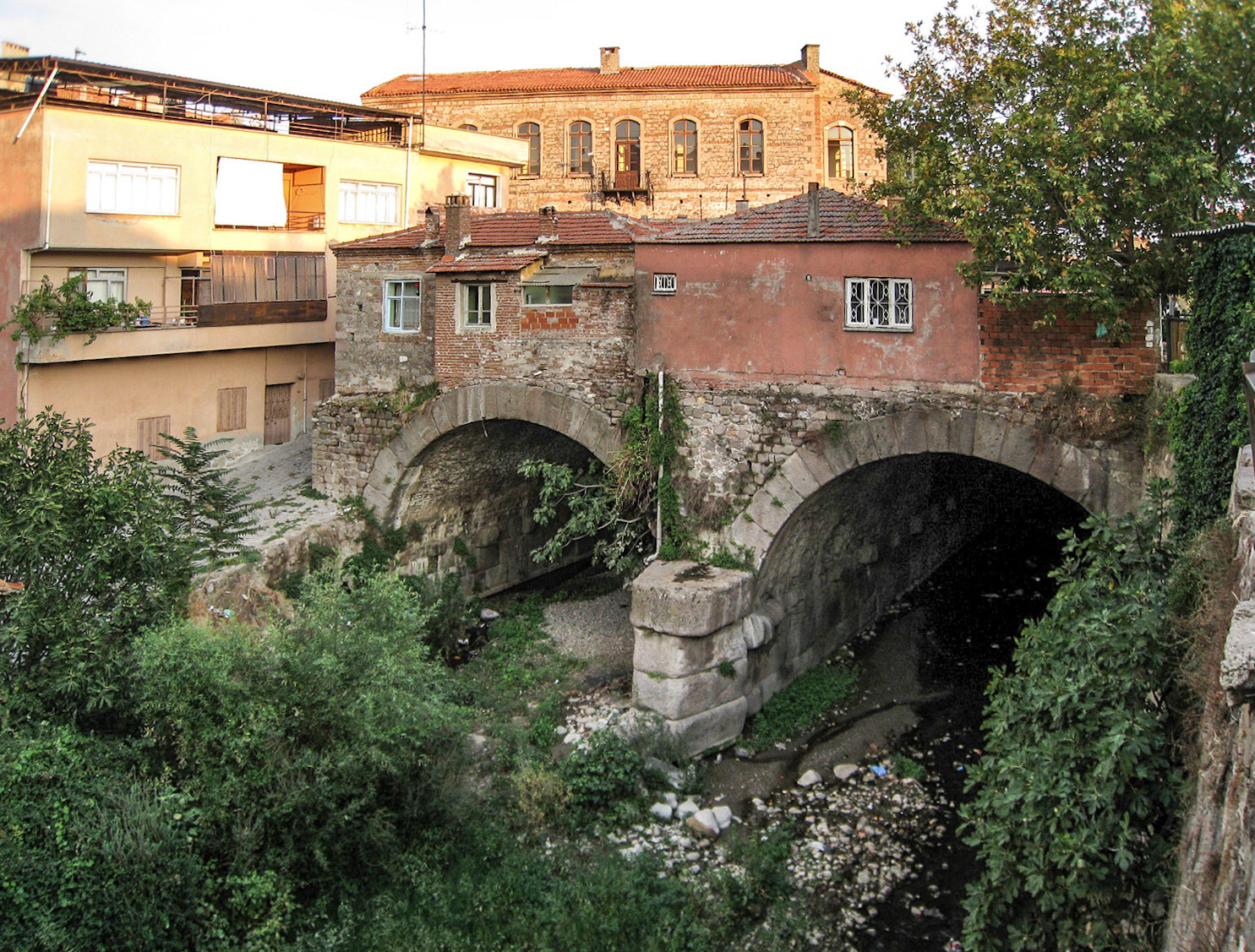
Roman bridge of Pergamon

Philetairos' design of the city was shaped above all by circumstantial considerations. Only under Eumenes II was this approach discarded and the city plan begins to show signs of an overall plan. Contrary to earlier attempts at an orthogonal street system, a fan-shaped design seems to have been adopted for the area around the gymnasium, with streets up to four metres wide, apparently intended to enable effective traffic flow. In contrast to it, Philetairos' system of alleys was created unsystematically, although the topic is still under investigation. Where the lay of the land prevented the laying of a street, small alleys were installed as connections instead. In general, therefore, there are large, broad streets (plateiai) and small, narrow connecting streets (stenopoi).

The nearly 200 metre wide Pergamon Bridge under the forecourt of the Red Basilica in the centre of Bergama is the largest bridge substruction from antiquity.

=== Water supply ===
The inhabitants of Pergamon were supplied with water by an effective system. In addition to cisterns, there was a system of nine pipes (seven Hellenistic ceramic pipes and two open Roman channels. The system provided around 30,000–35,000 cubic metres of water per day.

The Madradağ aqueduct was a ceramic pipe with a diameter of 18 cm which already brought water to the citadel from a source over 40 kilometres away in the Madradağ mountains at 1174 m above sea level in the Hellenistic period. Their significance for architectural history lies in the form of the last kilometres from the mountains through a 200-metre-deep (660 ft) valley to the Akropolis. The pipe consisted of three channels, which ended 3 km north of the citadel, before reaching the valley, and emptied into a pool, which included a double sedimentation tank. This pool was 35 metres higher than the summit of the citadel. The pipe from the pool to the Acropolis consisted of only a single channel – a lead pipe pressurised to 200 mH2O. The water was able to cross the valley between the pool and the citadel with the help of this pressurised conduit. It functioned as a communicating vessel, such that the water rose to the height of the citadel on its own as a result of the pressurised pipe.

== Inscriptions ==
Greek inscriptions discovered at Pergamon include the rules of the town clerks, the so-called Astynomoi inscription, which has added to understanding of Greek municipal laws and regulations, including how roads were kept in repair, regulations regarding the public and private water supply and lavatories.

== Notable people ==
- Epigonus (3rd century BC), Greek sculptor.
- Andronicus of Pergamum (2nd century BC), Attalid ambassador to Rome.
- Biton of Pergamon (2nd or 3rd century BC), Greek writer and engineer.
- Hegesinus of Pergamon (c. 160 BC), Academic philosopher.
- Sosus of Pergamon (2nd century BC), Greek mosaic artist.
- Apollodorus (1st century BC), rhetor and teacher to Augustus.
- Cratippus of Pergamon (1st century BC), Peripatetic philosopher.
- Antipas of Pergamum (1st century AD), Christian martyr and saint.
- Aristocles (1st century AD), a Greek sophist
- Aelius Nicon (2nd century AD), Greek architect and builder.
- Aeschrion of Pergamon (2nd century AD), physician and tutor to Galen.
- Galen (c. 129–200/216 AD), Greek physician.
- Oribasius (c. 320-403 AD), Greek physician
- Aedesius (4th century), Neoplatonic philosopher
- Sosipatra (4th century), Neoplatonic philosopher
- Telephus, a Greek grammarian

== See also ==
- Allianoi
- List of ancient Greek cities

== Bibliography ==
- Grewe, Klaus; Özis, Ünal (1994). "Die antiken Flußüberbauungen von Pergamon und Nysa (Türkei)". Antike Welt (in German). 25 (4): 348–352.
- Kekeç, Tevhit (1989). Pergamon. Istanbul: Hitit Color. ISBN 9789757487012.
- Kosmetatou, Elizabeth (2003). "The Attalids of Pergamon". In Erskine, Andrew (ed.). A Companion to the Hellenistic World. Oxford: Blackwell. pp. 159–174. ISBN 1-4051-3278-7.
- McEvedy, Colin (2012). Cities of the Classical World. Penguin Global. ISBN 9781846144288.
- Tucker, Jack (2012). Innocents Return Abroad: Exploring Ancient Sites in Western Turkey. Jack Tucker. ISBN 9781478343585.
- Xenophon. Xenophon in Seven Volumes. Translated by Brownson, Carleton L. Cambridge, MA: Harvard University Press. vol. 1 (1918), vol. 2 (1921), vol. 3 (1922).
