= Asarotos oikos =

Roman mosaics

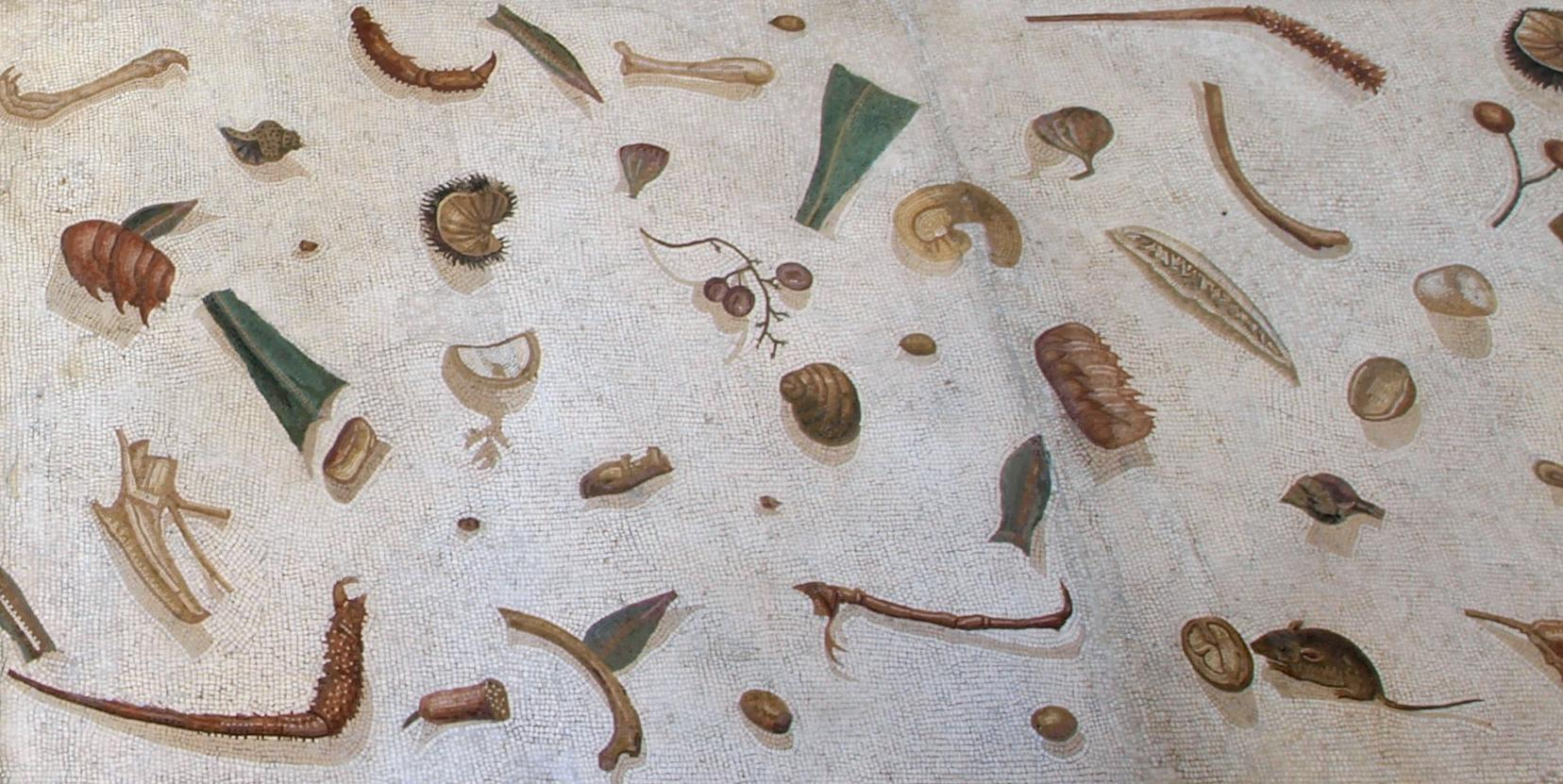
A picture of an asàrotos òikos mosaic.

Asàrotos òikos (Ancient Greek: ἀσάρωτος οἶκος), "the unswept floor, unswept house" - iconography of Ancient Roman mosaics depicting the dirty remnants of a banquet.

The theme is thought to be created by Sosus of Pergamon, according to Pliny the Elder:

"In [mosaics], the highest excellence has been attained by Sosus, who laid, at Pergamus, the mosaic pavement known as the "Asarotos œcos;" from the fact that he there represented, in small squares of different colours, the remnants of a banquet lying upon the pavement, and other things which are usually swept away with the broom, they having all the appearance of being left there by accident. There is a dove also, greatly admired, in the act of drinking, and throwing the shadow of its head upon the water; while other birds are to be seen sunning and pluming themselves, on the margin of a drinking-bowl." Natural History (XXXVI.LX.184)

One of the best examples is now in the Vatican museum, or Musei Vaticani. The mosaic at the Vatican is not the aforementioned Sosus mosaic; instead, they house an asàrotos òikos created by Heraclitus.

== Sources ==
- Fathy, Ehud. In the Guise of the Popular: the Deceptive Image of the Asàrotos Òikos Mosaic s. March 2022. Eikon / Imago 11:31-46
- Fathy, Ehud. “The asàrotos òikos Mosaics as an Elite Status Symbol”. Potestas: Estudios del Mundo Clásico e Historia del Arte 10 (2017): 5-30
- Fathy, Ehud. “From Earthly to Divine: The Transition of the asàrotos òikos Motif into Late Antiquity and Early Christian Art”. En Humanitas 75 (2020): 93–120.
- Fathy, Ehud. “The Asàrotos Òikos Influence on the Mosaics of Late Antiquity.” The 14th Conference of AIEMA, Nicosia 15-19 October 2018: Proceedings 1 (2023): 348–57.
- Fathy, Ehud. “Cultic Allusions in the Heraklitos Asàrotos Òikos Mosaic.” Potestas. Estudios Del Mundo Clásico e Historia Del Arte 14 (2019): 5–32. doi:10.6035/POTESTAS.2019.14.1.
- Elderkin, George Wicker. “Sosus and Aristophanes”. En Classical Philology, 32, no. 1 (1937): 74–75
- Ribi, Emil A. “Asárotos òikos-von der Kunst, die sich verbirgt”. En Zona Archeologica: Festschrift für Hans Peter Isler zum 60. Geburtstag, eds. S. Buzzi, D. Käch, E. Kistler et al., 361–369, pls. 55–56. Bonn, 2001.
- Ермолаева Е. Л. Об одной древнегреческой пародии и античных мозаиках в стиле «неприбранный пол» // Актуальные проблемы теории и истории искусства: сб. науч. статей. Вып. 5 / Под ред. С. В. Мальцевой, Е. Ю. Станюкович-Денисовой, А. В. Захаровой. – СПб.: НП-Принт, 2015. С. 69–76.
