= Sosus of Pergamon =

Ancient Greek mosaic artist

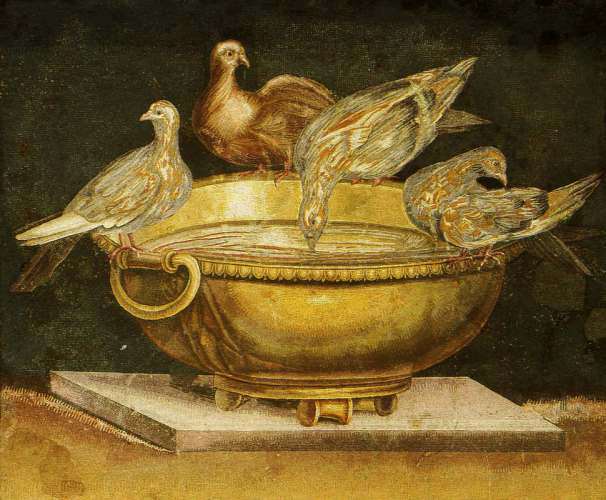
Mosaic showing doves drinking from a bowl, from Hadrian's villa, 2nd century AD, probably a copy of Sosus's work

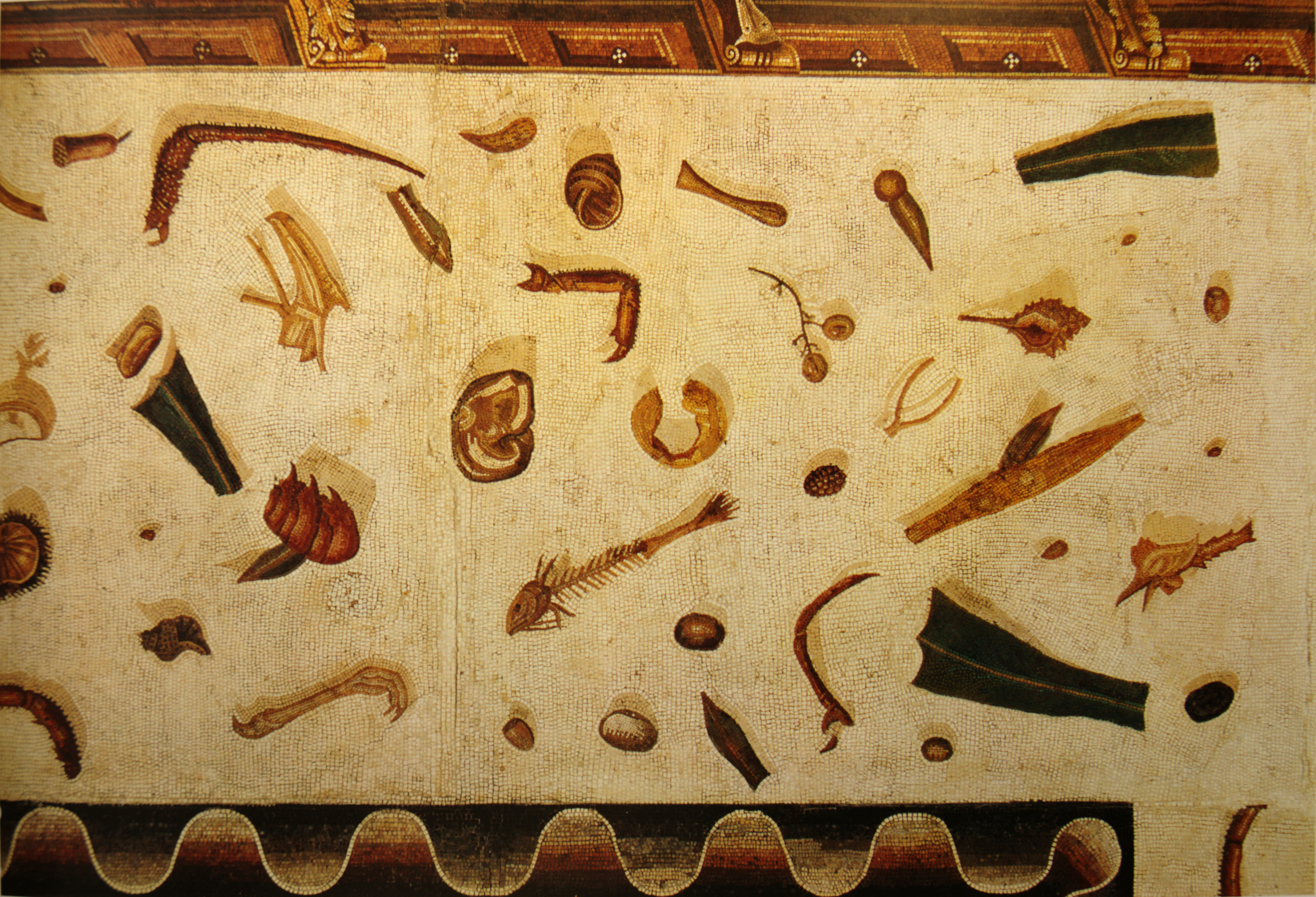
Unswept House, copy of Sosus' mosaic

Sosus of Pergamon (Ancient Greek: Σῶσος) was a Greek mosaic artist of the second century BC. He is the only mosaic artist whose name was recorded in literature. After the conquests of Alexander the Great, the Greeks of major centers such as Pergamon and Alexandria displayed their wealth in decorations that included mosaics.

== Works ==
The two famous works of Sosus include:

=== The Unswept House ===
Asarotos oikos, The Unswept House (Ancient Greek: ἀσάρωτος οἶκος) depicts the floor of a room covered with the remains of a feast, including fish, fruit and other fragments of food.

=== Doves Drinking from a Bowl ===
A mosaic from Hadrian's Villa, now in the Capitoline Museums, depicts a group of doves on a round bowl. As described by Pliny, one dove is drinking while the others are sunning themselves. The Doves of Pliny, or the Capitoline Doves depicts the doves artistically but realistically. The mosaic is made only of cubes of colored marble, without any colored glass as in other mosaics. It was discovered in 1737 during excavations at Hadrian's Villa led by Cardinal Giuseppe Alessandro Furietti, who thought it was the mosaic that Pliny had described, although other scholars think it is a copy of the original that was made for Hadrian. The Hadrian's villa mosaic has in turn been copied many times in many formats.
