= 150s BC =

This article concerns the period 159 BC – 150 BC.

== Events ==
=== 159 BC ===
==== Greece ====
- Attalus II Philadelphus succeeds his brother Eumenes II as king of Pergamon.

====== Seleucid Empire ======
- With the Seleucid victory in Judea over the Maccabees, Alcimus is re-established as the High Priest of Israel, and a strong force is left in Jerusalem to support him. However, he does not enjoy his triumph for long, as he dies soon after from a paralytic stroke.

====== Bactria ======
- While Eucratides I is in north west India to claim possession of the previous Bactrian King Demetrius I's territory there, the Parthians, under Mithradates I, annex two Bactrian provinces. Returning from India to reconquer them, Eucratides is murdered by his son.

=== 158 BC ===
==== By place ====
====== Asia Minor ======
- At the request of the Romans, Ariarathes V, king of Cappadocia, rejects a proposal from the Seleucid king, Demetrius I, for him to marry the sister of Demetrius I. In response, Seleucid forces attack Cappadocia and remove Ariarathes V from the Cappadocian throne. Demetrius I then replaces him with Orophernes Nicephorus, a supposed son of the late king, Ariarathes IV. With Ariarathes V deprived of his kingdom, he flees to Rome.

=== 157 BC ===
==== By place ====
====== Roman Republic ======
- The Carthaginians, prevented by their treaty with Rome from engaging in armed resistance, but equally guaranteed against any loss of territory, appeal to Rome against the depredations of King Masinissa of Numidia. The Roman censor Marcus Porcius Cato heads a commission which arbitrates a truce between Carthage and her former ally, Masinissa.
- During his time in Carthage, Cato is so struck by the evidence of Carthaginian prosperity that he is convinced that the security of Rome now depends on the annihilation of Carthage. From this time on, Cato keeps repeating the cry "Ceterum censeo Carthaginem esse delendam" ("Moreover, I advise that Carthage must be destroyed") at the end of all his speeches, no matter what subject they concern.
- After Ariarathes V has been deposed from the Cappadocian throne by the Seleucid king Demetrius I Soter and has fled to Rome, the new king of Cappadocia, Orophernes, sends two ambassadors to Rome to join the Seleucid emissaries of Demetrius in opposing Ariarathes V's return to power. Despite their efforts, Ariarathes V is restored to his throne by the Romans. However, Rome allows Orophernes to reign jointly with him. The joint government, however, does not last long, as Ariarathes V becomes sole king of Cappadocia shortly afterwards.

====== Seleucid Empire ======
- Jonathan Maccabeus is recognised by the Seleucids as a minor king within their dominions.

=== 156 BC ===
==== By place ====
====== Roman Republic ======
- The first Dalmatian war begins.

=== 155 BC ===
==== By place ====
====== Hispania ======
- Under the command of Punicus and then Caesarus, the Lusitani, a Hispanic tribe, reach a point near modern day Gibraltar. Here they are defeated by the Roman praetor Lucius Mummius.

====== Roman Republic ======
- As part of the Roman efforts to fully conquer and occupy the whole of Illyria, a Roman army under consul Publius Cornelius Scipio Nasica Corculum attacks the Dalmatians for the first time and conquers the Dalmatian capital of Delminium. As a result, the Dalmatians are compelled to pay tribute to Rome, which puts an end to the first Dalmatian war. In recognition of his victory, Corculum is granted a triumph in Rome.

====== Bactria ======
- Menander I (known as Milinda in Sanskrit and Pali) begins his reign as king of the Indo-Greek Kingdom. His territories cover the eastern dominions of the divided Greek empire of Bactria (Panjshir and Kapisa) and extend to the modern Pakistani province of Punjab, most of the Indian states of Punjab and Himachal Pradesh and the Jammu region. His capital is considered to have been Sagala, a prosperous city in northern Punjab believed to be modern Sialkot.

=== 154 BC ===
==== By place ====
====== Hispania ======
- The Lusitanians harry the inhabitants of the Roman provinces in Hispania. At the same time, the Celtiberians of Numantia on the Douro revolt against their Roman occupation.

====== Asia Minor ======
- After a two-year struggle, Attalus II Philadelphus of Pergamum is finally able to defeat Prusias II, the aggressive king of Bithynia in northern Anatolia. He is assisted in his battle against Prusias II by Ariarathes V of Cappadocia (who has sent his son Demetrius to command his forces) and by the Romans.
- After his victory, Attalus II insists on heavy reparations from Prusias II. In response, Prusias II sends his son Nicomedes to Rome to ask the Romans' help in reducing the amount of these reparations.

====== Egypt ======
- The Egyptian king Ptolemy VI Philometor defeats his brother, Ptolemy VIII Euergetes, after he attempts to seize Cyprus by force. Nevertheless Philometor restores his brother to Cyrenaica, marries one of his daughters to him, and grants him a grain subsidy.

====== China ======
- The Rebellion of the Seven States against the Han dynasty fails and Emperor Jing of Han further consolidates his power at the expense of the regional, semi-autonomous kings governing the eastern portion of the empire.

=== 153 BC ===
==== By place ====
====== Roman Republic ======
- The uprisings in Rome's Hispanic provinces oblige the year's consuls to take office earlier than the traditional date of 15 March, a change that becomes permanent. Some suggest that, as a consequence, January 1 becomes the first day of the Roman year.

====== Seleucid Empire ======
- The Seleucid king Demetrius I Soter's relations with Attalus II Philadelphus of Pergamum and Ptolemy VI Philometor of Egypt deteriorate to the point where they support a rival claimant to the Syrian throne, Alexander Balas, who claims to be the son of the former Seleucid king Antiochus IV Epiphanes and, therefore, a first cousin of Demetrius. He has been "discovered" by Heracleides, a former minister of Antiochus IV and brother of Timarchus, who has been executed by Demetrius I Soter in 160 BC after leading a revolt against him in Media.
- As a result of the rise of the pretender, Alexander Balas, Demetrius I Soter is forced to recall most of his garrisons in Judea. To retain control of Judea, he makes a bid to gain the loyalty of Jonathan Maccabeus, whom he permits to recruit an army and to take back the hostages that the Syrians are holding in the city of Acre. Jonathan gladly accepts these terms, takes up residence in Jerusalem and begins to fortify the city, becoming High Priest of Jerusalem until 143 BC.

====== Greece ======
- Substantial parts of the city of Sikyon are destroyed by an earthquake.

=== 152 BC ===
==== By place ====
====== Seleucid Empire ======
- The pretender to the Seleucid throne, Alexander Balas, makes contact with Jonathan Maccabeus offering him terms even more favorable than those offered by the king Demetrius I Soter. In particular, Alexander offers him the official appointment as High Priest in Jerusalem. In response, Jonathan withdraws his support from Demetrius and declares his allegiance to Alexander. Thus Jonathan becomes the first member of his family to achieve appointment as High Priest.

=== 151 BC ===
==== By place ====
====== Carthage ======
- The Carthaginian debt to Rome is fully repaid, meaning that, according to Carthage, the treaty with Rome, which was put in place at the end of the Second Punic War, is no longer in force. The Romans do not agree with this interpretation. Instead they view the treaty as a permanent declaration of Carthaginian subordination to Rome.
- Numidia launches another border raid on Carthaginian soil, besieging a town. In response Carthage launches a large military expedition (25,000 soldiers) to repel the Numidian invaders.

====== Roman Republic ======
- At Polybius' request, Scipio Aemilianus manages to gain the support of the Roman statesman Cato the Elder (whose son has married Scipio's sister Aemilia) for a proposal to release (and return to Greece) the 300 Achaean internees who are still being held without trial after being deported to Rome in 167 BC.
- Roman forces help the thriving Greek commercial port of Massilia combat raids from the Celts from Cisalpine Gaul.
- Roman armies under the leadership of praetor Servius Sulpicius Galba and the proconsul Lucius Licinius Lucullus arrive in Hispania Ulterior and begin the process of subduing the local population. The revolt of the Celtiberians of Numantia is stopped.

====== India ======
- Agnimitra succeeds his father Pushyamitra Shunga as emperor of the Shunga dynasty.

=== 150 BC ===
==== By place ====
====== Carthage ======
- Scipio Aemilianus is sent by the Roman general, Lucius Licinius Lucullus, to Numidia to obtain some elephants from the Numidian king Masinissa, the friend of his grandfather Scipio Africanus. While there, he witnesses a great but indecisive battle between the Numidians and the Carthaginians. The latter then ask Scipio Aemilianus to arrange a settlement, but the negotiations break down.

====== Roman Republic ======
- The Roman Senate shows displeasure with Carthage's decision to wage war against its neighbour without Roman consent, and tells Carthage that in order to avoid a war it has to "satisfy the Roman People". The Roman censor, Cato the Elder, urges the destruction of Carthage and the Roman Senate orders the gathering of an army.

====== Seleucid Empire ======
- The pretender to the Seleucid throne, Alexander Balas, who claims to be the son of the late Antiochus IV, defeats the Seleucid king, Demetrius I Soter, in battle and kills him. The Roman Senate, along with Attalus II Philadelphus of Pergamum and Ptolemy VI Philometor of Egypt, support Alexander Balas and he becomes the ruler of the Seleucid Empire. Demetrius I Soter's son, Demetrius, goes into exile in Crete.
- The new king of the Seleucid Empire, Alexander Balas, marries Cleopatra Thea, a daughter of Ptolemy VI Philometor of Egypt.

====== Asia Minor ======
- Nicomedes, the son of king Prusias II of Bithynia, who has been sent to Rome to argue for smaller reparations arising from his father's unsuccessful war against Pergamum, gains the support of the Roman Senate to the point where Prusias sends an emissary with secret orders to assassinate Nicomedes. However, the emissary reveals the plot to Nicomedes and persuades him to rebel against his father.
- Mithridates V Euergetes succeeds his uncle Mithridates IV Philopator Philadelphus as king of Pontus. He continues the strategy of maintaining an alliance with the Romans which was started by his predecessor.

====== Hispania ======
- The Romans, led by praetor Servius Sulpicius Galba, defeat the Lusitanians in a major battle in Hispania. He then breaks his promise to the defeated Lusitanian rebels by instituting a massacre of 9,000 of their number during the peace talks. Later 20,000 more Lusitanians are sold as slaves in Gaul.

==== By topic ====
====== Art ======
- The making of the statue Hellenistic Ruler begins and is finished ten years later. It is now kept at the Museo Nazionale Romano in Rome.
- The enlargement of the Great Stupa of Sanchi, Madhya Pradesh, India begins, taking about 100 years.

== Births ==
159 BC

- Quintus Mucius Scaevola Augur, politician of the Roman Republic and an early authority on Roman law (d. 88 BC) (approximate date)

158 BC

- Publius Rutilius Rufus, Roman consul, statesman, orator and historian (d. c. 78 BC)

157 BC

- 30 July – Wu of Han, who will be emperor of the Chinese Han dynasty from 141 BC (d. 87 BC)
- Gaius Marius, Roman general, consul (approximate year) (d. 86 BC)
- Sanatruces (also known as Sinatruces or Sanatruk), King of Parthia who will rule the Parthian Empire from around 77 BC (approximate date) (d. c. 70 BC)

156 BC

- Emperor Wu of Han

154 BC

- Gaius Gracchus, Roman politician, younger brother of Tiberius Sempronius Gracchus, who, like him, will pursue a popular political agenda that ultimately ends in his death (d. 121 BC)
- Lucius Aelius Stilo Praeconinus, Roman philologist and speechwriter (d. 74 BC)

== Deaths ==
159 BC

- Charops of Epirus, ruler of Epirus.
- Alcimus, high priest of Judea.
- Eucratides I, king of Bactria, who has reigned since around 170 BC.
- Eumenes II, king of Pergamon.
- Publius Terentius Afer (Terence), Roman comic dramatist, the author of six verse comedies that are long regarded as models of pure Latin (b. c. 195 BC) (approximate date).

158 BC

- Emperor Kōgen of Japan, according to legend.

157 BC

- July 6 – Wen of Han, Emperor of the Chinese Han dynasty since 180 BC (b. 200 BC)

155 BC

- Empress Dowager Bo, imperial concubine of Emperor Gao of the Han dynasty

154 BC

- Chao Cuo, Chinese advisor and official of the Han dynasty (b. c. 200 BC)
- Liu Pi, Chinese prince and general of the Han dynasty (b. 216 BC)

152 BC

- Marcus Aemilius Lepidus, Roman statesman, consul, Pontifex Maximus and censor; as a praetor, he has been governor of Sicily in 191 BC.
- Marcus Porcius Cato Licinianus, Roman jurist, son of Cato the Elder by his first wife, Licinia.
- Zhang Cang, Chinese scholar, general and prime-minister (b. 253 BC).

151 BC

- Pushyamitra Shunga, Indian emperor and founder of the Indian Shunga dynasty, who has reigned since 185 BC

150 BC

- Demetrius I Soter, Seleucid king of Syria (b. c. 187 BC)
- Mithridates IV Philopator Philadelphus, king of Pontus
- Paerisades III, king of the Bosporan Kingdom
