= War of Aristonicus =

Revolt in Pergamon, between 133 and 129 BC

The War of Aristonicus (133/2 – 129 BC; also known as the Revolt of Aristonicus) was a military conflict between the Roman Republic, with its allies, and Aristonicus, also called Eumenes III, a claimant to the Pergamene throne. Attalus III, Permagene king until his death in 133 BC, willed the kingdom to Rome; Aristonicus' invasion of Pergamum, the intervention of local Anatolian powers, and Roman attempts to assert their claim precipitated the conflict.

The Romans and their local allies were victorious after some setbacks, capturing Aristonicus at the Stratonicea in Lydia in 130 BC under then-consul Marcus Perperna. Manlius Aquillius succeeded Perperna in command and, after some years in the province, returned to Rome in 126 BC in triumph. The settlement of the annexed Pergamene kingdom, dubbed the Roman province of Asia, continued to be debated at least until 123 BC.

== Origins ==
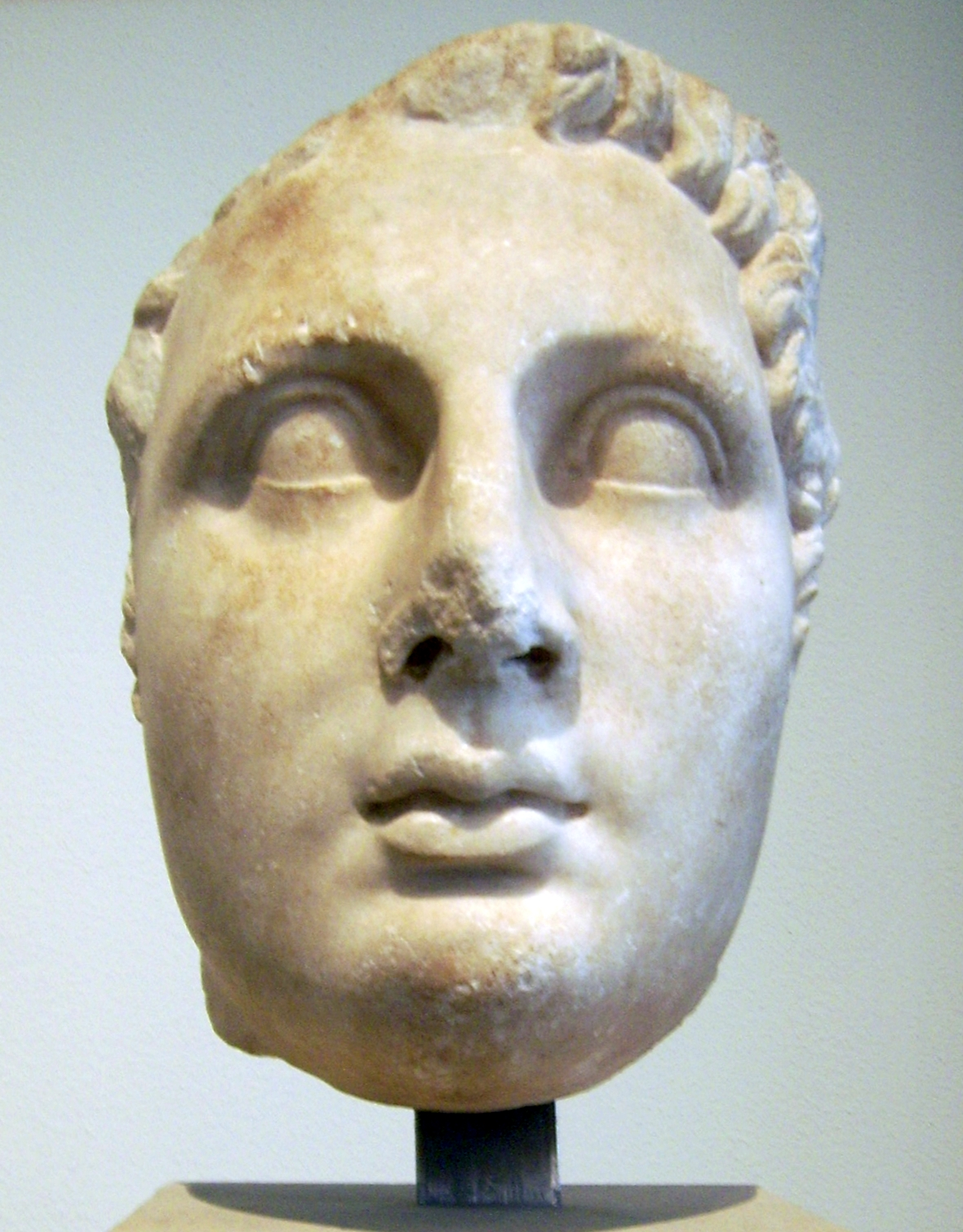
Portrait of either Attalus II or Attalus III. The death of Attalus III in 133 BC, along with his will bequeathing the kingdom to Rome, precipitated the conflict.

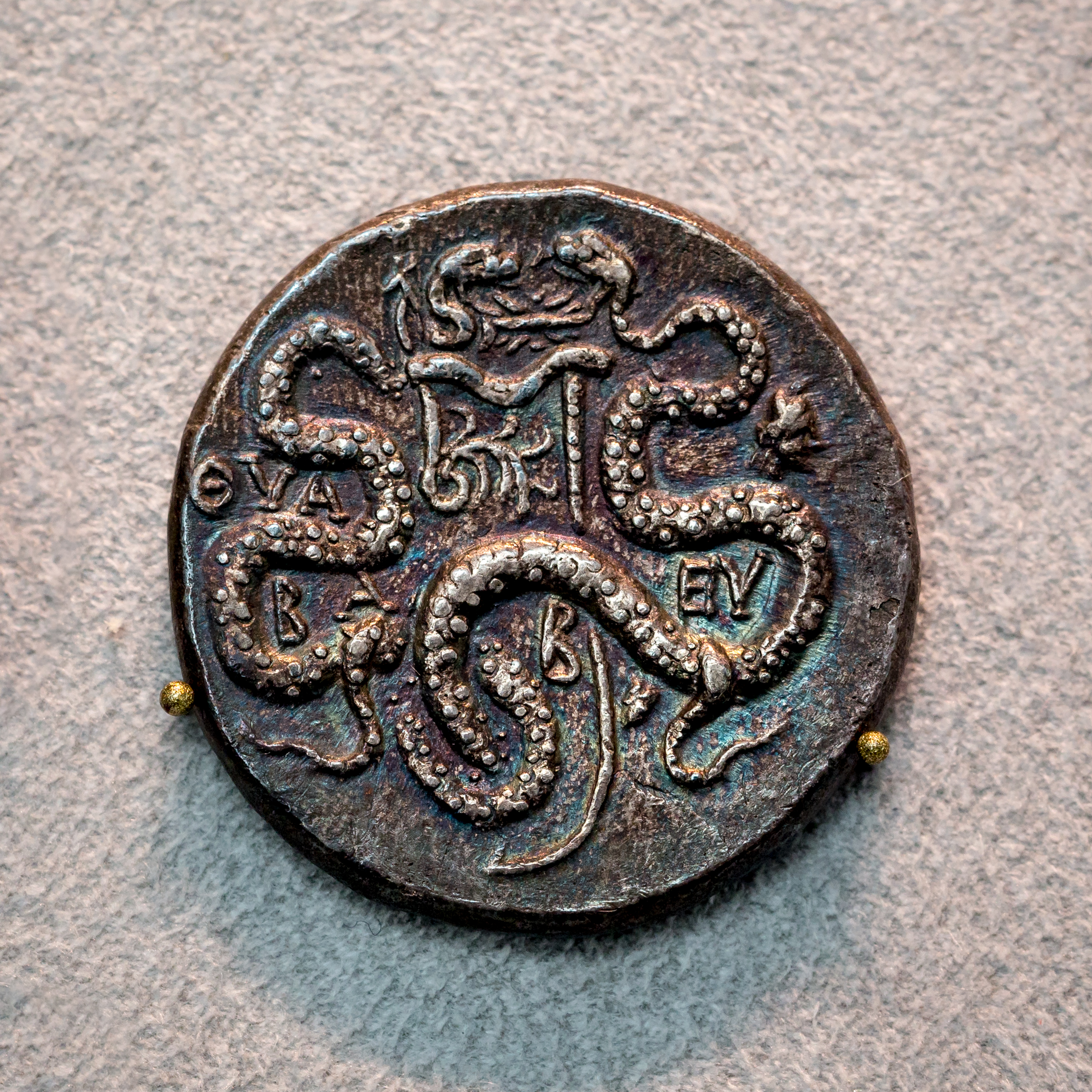
Quickly after Attalus III's death, Aristonicus took control of the mints and issued cistophoric tetradrachms under his own authority. This example is dated between 133 and 131 BC.

Attalus III was the king of Pergamon until his death in early 133 BC. His will included a provision bequeathing the Pergamene kingdom to the Roman people. This provision was unforeseen. At his death, Attalus was in his thirties. Nor was Rome entirely expected to take the kingdom, since wills with foreign states beneficiaries of this sort were commonly used to disincentivise assassination and adjusted thereafter. The will may have been drawn up specifically to call in Roman aid if Aristonicus moved against Attalus in life.

Aristonicus, the main Roman enemy, claimed to be an illegitimate son of Eumenes II, Attalus' father. He seized the kingdom quickly after Attalus' death. Appeals to Rome against this usurpation emerged rapidly; they were first heard by Marcus Cosconius, governor of the Roman province of Macedonia. The specific start of the conflict is not clear: while A N Sherwin-White and others suggest Aristonicus started his effort in central Pergamon, David Potter instead suggests an invasion from Thrace supported by Thracian mercenaries.

== Roman intervention ==
Any immediate Roman response was muted: if Cosconius in Macedonia took action, it was likely indirect and against Thrace rather than against Pergamon proper. When news of the Attalid will reached Rome that year, the populist tribune Tiberius Gracchus seized on the annexation and by legislation moved to use the Attalid treasury in his agrarian programme.

Local cities resisted Aristonicus but were suppressed in some early successes. His forces, however, never seemed to take the city of Pergamon itself and faltered in an offensive against Smyrna and after a naval defeat against Ephesus at Cyme. Amid these setbacks, Aristonicus opened his ranks to slaves, likely an expedient rather than an egalitarian social policy, and then triggered a series of Anatolian kings to raise their banners, including Nicomedes II of Bithynia, Mithridates V of Pontus, and Ariarathes V of Cappadocia.

News of the war in Asia minor arrived in Rome probably after Tiberius Gracchus' bill some time in the latter half of 133 BC: no action was taken at Rome until a senatorial embassy was sent in 132 BC. The purpose of the senatorial embassy is not known: scholars have suggested it could have been sent prior to widespread knowledge of Aristonicus' war in expectation of an orderly transition, sent as legates with war powers, and sent as advisors to a new Roman governor. Roman involvement in Asia minor had been minimal since the early 2nd century BC. But in this instance, triggered by the Gracchan bill and a desire to maintain the balance of power in the region – especially to fill the power vacuum which, it appeared, would be chaotically fought over by the Anatolian kings and would eventually destabilise Macedonia – Rome intervened. The province of Asia was then assigned in 131 BC to one of the consuls of that year, Publius Licinius Crassus Dives Mucianus. Roman allies in the region, aware of Rome's position, quickly moved to cooperate with Crassus.

Crassus and his army were, however, defeated in 130 BC by Aristonicus near Leucae in Ionia; Crassus was himself captured and killed. Roman efforts continued and were buoyed by the end of the Spanish wars and suppression of a slave revolt in Sicily. In the dead proconsul's place, the consul Marcus Perperna was assigned with a new army. Perperna bottled up Aristonicus at Stratonicea in Lydia and took him prisoner. The next year's consul, Manlius Aquillius took command after Perperna died of natural causes in 130. Aquillius continued the campaign into Mysia and Caria. Besieging enemy cities took some time and after military victory in 129 BC, Aquillius stayed in Asia to settle affairs until 126.

== Outcome and provincialisation ==
Roman provinces, including Asia – the former Pergamene realm – on the eve of the First Mithridatic War. Asia was likely minimally administered in the aftermath of Aristonicus' war.

The customary ten senatorial legates arrived after Aquillius' victory. He distributed land from Pergamum to allied princes who aided Roman war efforts: Phrygia became part of Pontus; Lycaonia was given to Cappadocia. He is also attested building roads in the province to aid movement of troops but little else is known before his departure for Rome in 126 BC to triumph.

A senatorial decree stating that governors were to accept Attalus III's decisions was dated by many scholars to late in 133 BC, suggesting that Rome decided on provincialisation from an early point. Erich S. Gruen in The Hellenistic world and the coming of Rome, however, suggests that the decree was passed at a later date, probably 129 BC, when a long-term settlement of the region became possible. Gruen further argues, following Appian, that Rome left the area largely under its protection without taxation until domestic politics – Gaius Gracchus in 123 BC seeking revenues for a revived land programme – brought the province under taxation. If taxation was instituted around 129 BC, the normal date given to a senatus consultum de agro Pergameno, tax contracts would have to have been let by the censors in 131 BC, which Gruen rejects as implausible. Even in the absence of taxation, expenses would have been paid for by seizure of the Attalid treasury and exploitation of the former royal estates.

Roman war aims were initially minimal, given inscriptional evidence of freedom granted to formerly Pergamene cities pursuant to the Attalid will. Aquillius' lex provinciae likely limited itself to determination of borders – many of the land donations allied states were reverted when Aquillius returned to Rome amid allegations that he accepted bribes – and establishing the regular presence of Roman magistrate to mediate interstate affairs. The magistrates sent to Asia until the First Mithridatic War controlled minimal military forces and acted largely within Rome's system of eastern alliances to persuade kings and mediate interstate disputes. Nor was direct judicial jurisdiction assumed: because of the free status of formerly Pergamene cities, Roman magistrates had little right to intervene in disputes occurring in those cities or override local legislation. Only after cities in Asia cooperated with Mithridates VI's invasion were most of the formerly Pergamene communities stripped of their immunities and fell under direct Roman administration.
