= Ex voto of the Attalids (Delphi) =

Several Hellenistic kings dedicated monuments in the sanctuary of Apollo in Delphi, in an effort to emphasize their prestige. Among those kings were the Attalids of Pergamon, who occupied a prominent position at the highest point of the Sacred Way, close to the temple of Apollo where they erected their ex votos.

== Description ==
The highest part of the Sacred Way and the area around the temple of Apollo in Delphi was one of the most prominent positions in the sanctuary and was built at a relatively late date. To the right there is a square situated at a height of 2.5 meters above the temple's level, on a specially made terrace, constructed under order of the king Attalus I of Pergamon (240–197 B.C.). The square encloses a total surface of about 1000 sq m (measuring 41×23 meters) and constituted an extension of the temple area to the east. The western end was delimited by a late archaic treasury which remains to this date unidentified. Initially there were erected four monuments, which are considered contemporary: they comprise a Doric portico covering the northern part of the square (later transformed into a cistern), dedicated by Attalus I and repaired by Attalus II; an "oikos" (house) in the northeastern corner; the base of a column in the northwestern corner, where the statue of Attalus I stood; finally a rectangular pedestal made of porous stone, of unidentified use. The incomers to the sanctuary entered from the east and those following the Sacred Way entered by means of a staircase starting next to the ex voto of the Rhodians. Slightly later, in 182 B.C., Attalus' successor, Eumenes II, erected a bronze statue of himself mounting a horse, the base of which is still extant today next to the monument of his predecessor.
