= 154 BC =

154 BC in various calendars
- Gregorian calendar: 154 BC; CLIV BC
- Ab urbe condita: 600
- Ancient Egypt era: XXXIII dynasty, 170
- Pharaoh: Ptolemy VI Philometor, 27
- Ancient Greek Olympiad (summer): 156th Olympiad, year 3
- Assyrian calendar: 4597
- Balinese saka calendar: N/A
- Bengali calendar: −747 – −746
- Berber calendar: 797
- Buddhist calendar: 391
- Burmese calendar: −791
- Byzantine calendar: 5355–5356
- Chinese calendar: 丙戌年 (Fire Dog); 2544 or 2337 — to — 丁亥年 (Fire Pig); 2545 or 2338
- Coptic calendar: −437 – −436
- Discordian calendar: 1013
- Ethiopian calendar: −161 – −160
- Hebrew calendar: 3607–3608
- Hindu calendars
- Vikram Samvat: −97 – −96
- Shaka Samvat: N/A
- Kali Yuga: 2947–2948
- Holocene calendar: 9847
- Iranian calendar: 775 BP – 774 BP
- Islamic calendar: 799 BH – 798 BH
- Javanese calendar: N/A
- Julian calendar: N/A
- Korean calendar: 2180
- Minguo calendar: 2065 before ROC 民前2065年
- Nanakshahi calendar: −1621
- Seleucid era: 158/159 AG
- Thai solar calendar: 389–390
- Tibetan calendar: མེ་ཕོ་ཁྱི་ལོ་ (male Fire-Dog) −27 or −408 or −1180 — to — མེ་མོ་ཕག་ལོ་ (female Fire-Boar) −26 or −407 or −1179

Year 154 BC was a year of the pre-Julian Roman calendar. At the time it was known as the Year of the Consulship of Opimius and Albinus/Glabrio (or, less frequently, year 600 Ab urbe condita). The denomination 154 BC for this year has been used since the early medieval period, when the Anno Domini calendar era became the prevalent method in Europe for naming years.

== Events ==
=== By place ===
==== Hispania ====
- The Lusitanians harry the inhabitants of the Roman provinces in Hispania. At the same time, the Celtiberians of Numantia on the Douro revolt against their Roman occupation.

==== Asia Minor ====
- After a two-year struggle, Attalus II Philadelphus of Pergamum is finally able to defeat Prusias II, the aggressive king of Bithynia in northern Anatolia. He is assisted in his battle against Prusias II by Ariarathes V of Cappadocia (who has sent his son Demetrius to command his forces) and by the Romans.
- After his victory, Attalus II insists on heavy reparations from Prusias II. In response, Prusias II sends his son Nicomedes to Rome to ask the Romans' help in reducing the amount of these reparations.

==== Egypt ====
- The Egyptian king Ptolemy VI Philometor defeats his brother, Ptolemy VIII Euergetes, after he attempts to seize Cyprus by force. Nevertheless Philometor restores his brother to Cyrenaica, marries one of his daughters to him, and grants him a grain subsidy.

==== China ====
- The Rebellion of the Seven States against the Han dynasty fails and Emperor Jing of Han further consolidates his power at the expense of the regional, semi-autonomous kings governing the eastern portion of the empire.

== Births ==
- Gaius Gracchus, Roman politician, younger brother of Tiberius Sempronius Gracchus, who, like him, will pursue a popular political agenda that ultimately ends in his death (d. 121 BC)
- Lucius Aelius Stilo Praeconinus, Roman philologist (d. 74 BC)

== Deaths ==
- Chao Cuo, Chinese advisor and official of the Han dynasty (b. c. 200 BC)
- Liu Pi, Chinese prince and general of the Han dynasty (b. 216 BC)
