= Stratonice of Pergamon =

Princess of Cappadocia and queen of Pergamon (d. ~135 BC)

Stratonice (Greek: Στρατονίκη; died about 135 BC) was a princess of Cappadocia and through marriage a queen of Pergamon.

== Life ==
Stratonice was of Greek Macedonian and Persian ancestry. She was the first child born to King Ariarathes IV of Cappadocia and Queen Antiochis. Her younger brothers were Ariarathes V and Orophernes. Her paternal grandparents were King Ariarathes III and Queen Stratonice of Cappadocia, while her maternal grandparents were the Seleucid monarchs, Antiochus III the Great and Laodice III. She was born and raised in Cappadocia.

In 188 BC, Cappadocia was accepted as a Roman ally. Later that year, Stratonice married King Eumenes II of Pergamon, based on an arrangement between her father and Eumenes II. The Kingdom of Pergamon, like Cappadocia, were allies of Rome. Eumenes II and Stratonice were distantly related, as they were direct descendants of Seleucus I Nicator.

Eumenes II visited Rome in 172 BC. During his visit, Eumenes II expressed his hostility towards King Perseus of Macedon. He informed the Roman Senate about Perseus' alleged plans to gain influence in Greece. On his return to Pergamon, Eumenes II was attacked near Cirrha and was thought at the time to have been killed. Eumenes' brother Attalus II Philadelphus became king and married Stratonice. When Eumenes II returned, his brother ceded power and Stratonice returned to Eumenes II.

Prior to 159 BC, Stratonice dedicated a statue of the goddess Athena in the library of Pergamon. In 159 BC, Eumenes II died. His brother, Attalus II Philadelphus, succeeded him and remarried Stratonice. Stratonice had children from her marriage to Eumenes II, among whom was his son Attalus III.

Attalus III was too young to reign as king. So Attalus II acted as a regent for Attalus III. Attalus III accepted the honorific title Philometor, which means the one who loves his mother. Attalus II appointed his nephew/stepson as his successor. In 153 BC, the succession was confirmed by the Roman Senate.

Stratonice and Attalus III had a very close relationship. During her reign with her second husband, her brother Ariarathes V of Cappadocia was brought to their kingdom, because her other brother Orophernes became King, and Orophernes was supported by their first cousin, the Seleucid King Demetrius I Soter. In 138 BC, Attalus II died and Attalus III succeeded as King. Stratonice died about 135 BC. It is possible that Attalus III poisoned those individuals he held responsible for the death of his mother Stratonice and his wife Berenice.

During her reign as Queen of Pergamon, two statues were dedicated to Stratonice. One was set up at Pergamon and the other on the Greek island of Delos. The Pergamene statue was dedicated by Attalus III. Most probably due to her family's connections in Athens, the Demos of Athens honoured Stratonice with a marble statue of her on Delos. The Greek sculptor Damophon sculpted her statue free of charge.

Both statues' inscriptions only state that Stratonice was the daughter of Ariarathes IV. Her Delian statue states on a bronze plaque "her virtue and goodwill toward it". Both statues of Stratonice identify her as the Queen of Pergamon and a queen of the Attalid Dynasty. These two statues represented her political role in Pergamon.

== Sources ==
- C. Knight, Penny cyclopaedia of the Society for the Diffusion of Useful Knowledge, Volumes 3-4, Society for the Diffusion of Useful Knowledge (Great Britain), 1835
- P. Cartledge, P. Garnsey & E.S. Gruen, Hellenistic constructs: essays in culture, history and historiography, University of California Press, 1997
- J.B. Lin Foxhall, When men were men: masculinity, power and identity in classical antiquity, Routledge, 1998
- O. Palagia & J.J. Pollitt, Personal Styles in Greek Sculpture, Cambridge University Press, 1999
- W. Bell Dinsmoor, "The Repair of the Athena Parthenos: A Story of Five Dowels". American Journal of Archaeology 1934. 38(1).
- Mikalson, Jon D, 1998. Religion in Hellenistic Athens. "Delian Apollo"
