= 158 =

158 may refer to:

- 158 (number), the natural number following 157 and preceding 159
- AD 158, a year
- 158 BC, a year
- 158 (New Jersey bus), United States
- 158 Regiment RLC
- Ferrari 158, a Formula One racing car
- Alfa Romeo 158, a Grand Prix racing car
- UFC 158, a mixed martial arts event held by the Ultimate Fighting Championship
- PS 158, a public elementary school in New York City
- ONE 158, a combat sports event produced by ONE Championship
- Tatra 158 Phoenix, a heavy truck
- British Rail Class 158, a DMU train used in the UK
