= Antiochis (daughter of Antiochus the Great) =

Seleucid princess and queen of Cappadocia

Antiochis (Ancient Greek: Aντιoχίς) (d. 163 or 162 BC) was a Hellenistic princess from the dynasty of the Seleucids and in the first half of the second century BC queen of Cappadocia.

Antiochis was a daughter of the Seleucid king Antiochus III the Great and his wife Laodice. Some time before the war of her father against the Romans she married king Ariarathes IV of Cappadocia, who therefore supported his father-in-law in the battle of Magnesia (190 BC). However, Antiochus III lost the battle. Antiochis bore her husband a son, who was called Mithridates before his accession to the throne and succeeded his father as Ariarathes V of Cappadocia, and two daughters, among them Stratonice, who first married king Eumenes II of Pergamon and afterwards his brother and successor Attalus II Philadelphus.

According to the questionable report of the ancient Greek-Sicilian historian Diodorus Siculus Antiochis, allegedly an unscrupulous woman, is supposed to have been barren and therefore to have foisted two sons called Ariarathes and Orophernes. Later she is said to have given birth to the above-mentioned three children and to have told the truth to her husband. Thereupon she should have provided her foisted sons with sufficient money and sent the older one to Rome and the younger one to Ionia to make it possible for her legitimate son to succeed his father without difficulties.

After the death of Ariarathes IV in 163 BC, Antiochis moved back to her birth family's homeland in Antioch, along with her other daughter (whose name is unknown, but not Stratonice). Her stay there was short, however; she and her daughter died, allegedly of assassination, in 163 or 162 BC. Polybius blames the death on an assassination by Seleucid regent Lysias, who did not wish to have more nobles of distinguished bloodlines in the city able to oppose him and potentially challenge his authority. That said, Polybius was personally friends with Lysias's rival Demetrius I, so he may have been eager to assume the worst of Lysias.
