= 158 BC =

158 BC in various calendars
- Gregorian calendar: 158 BC; CLVIII BC
- Ab urbe condita: 596
- Ancient Egypt era: XXXIII dynasty, 166
- Pharaoh: Ptolemy VI Philometor, 23
- Ancient Greek Olympiad (summer): 155th Olympiad, year 3
- Assyrian calendar: 4593
- Balinese saka calendar: N/A
- Bengali calendar: −751 – −750
- Berber calendar: 793
- Buddhist calendar: 387
- Burmese calendar: −795
- Byzantine calendar: 5351–5352
- Chinese calendar: 壬午年 (Water Horse); 2540 or 2333 — to — 癸未年 (Water Goat); 2541 or 2334
- Coptic calendar: −441 – −440
- Discordian calendar: 1009
- Ethiopian calendar: −165 – −164
- Hebrew calendar: 3603–3604
- Hindu calendars
- Vikram Samvat: −101 – −100
- Shaka Samvat: N/A
- Kali Yuga: 2943–2944
- Holocene calendar: 9843
- Iranian calendar: 779 BP – 778 BP
- Islamic calendar: 803 BH – 802 BH
- Javanese calendar: N/A
- Julian calendar: N/A
- Korean calendar: 2176
- Minguo calendar: 2069 before ROC 民前2069年
- Nanakshahi calendar: −1625
- Seleucid era: 154/155 AG
- Thai solar calendar: 385–386
- Tibetan calendar: ཆུ་ཕོ་རྟ་ལོ་ (male Water-Horse) −31 or −412 or −1184 — to — ཆུ་མོ་ལུག་ལོ་ (female Water-Sheep) −30 or −411 or −1183

The Year 158 BC was a year of the pre-Julian Roman calendar. At the time it was known as the Year of the Consulship of Lepidus and Laenas (or, less frequently, year 596 Ab urbe condita) and the Sixth Year of Houyuan. The denomination 158 BC for this year has been used since the early medieval period, when the Anno Domini calendar era became the prevalent method in Europe for naming years.

== Events ==
=== By place ===
==== Asia Minor ====
- At the request of the Romans, Ariarathes V, king of Cappadocia, rejects a proposal from the Seleucid king, Demetrius I, for him to marry the sister of Demetrius I. In response, Seleucid forces attack Cappadocia and remove Ariarathes V from the Cappadocian throne. Demetrius I then replaces him with Orophernes Nicephorus, a supposed son of the late king, Ariarathes IV. With Ariarathes V deprived of his kingdom, he flees to Rome.

== Births ==
- Publius Rutilius Rufus, Roman consul, statesman, orator and historian (d. c. 78 BC).

== Deaths ==
- Emperor Kōgen of Japan, according to legend.
