= Library of Pergamum =

Ancient Greek building in Pergamon, Anatolia

Coordinates: 39°7′56″N 27°11′3″E

- Βιβλιοθήκη τοῦ Περγάμου (Greek)
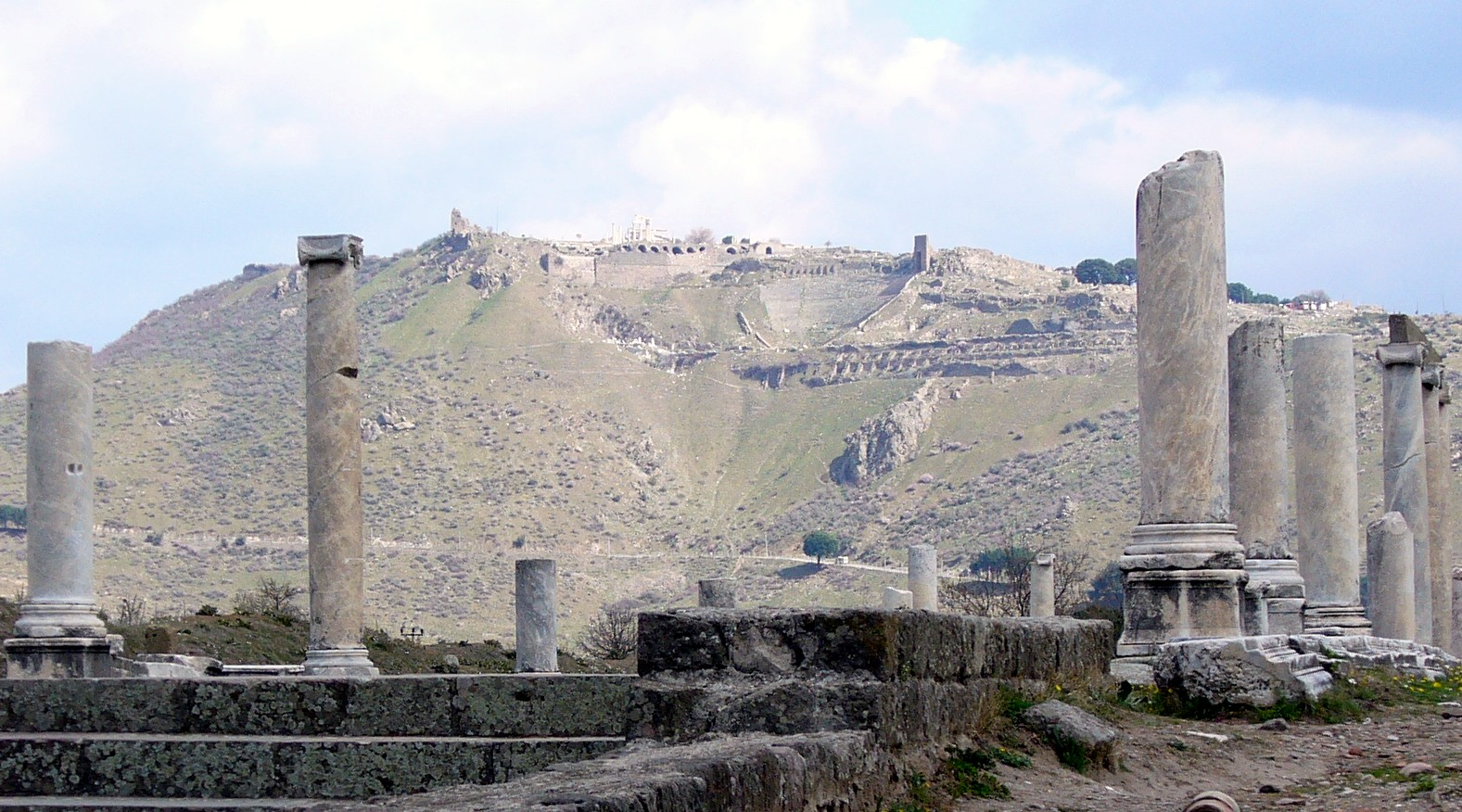
- The Acropolis of Pergamon, seen from the Via Tecta at the entrance to the Asklepion

- Location within Turkey
- Type: National library
- Cultures: Greek, Roman
- Location: Pergamon
- Region: Aegean
- Part of: Ancient Greece, Ancient Rome

Site notes
- Excavation dates: 1885–1890, restored 1950–1985
- Condition: partly restored ruins
- Public access: Archaeological site

The Library of Pergamum (Greek: Βιβλιοθήκη του Πέργαμον) is an ancient Greek building in Pergamon, Anatolia, today located nearby the modern town of Bergama, in the İzmir Province of western Turkey. It was one of the most important libraries in the ancient world.

== The city of Pergamum ==
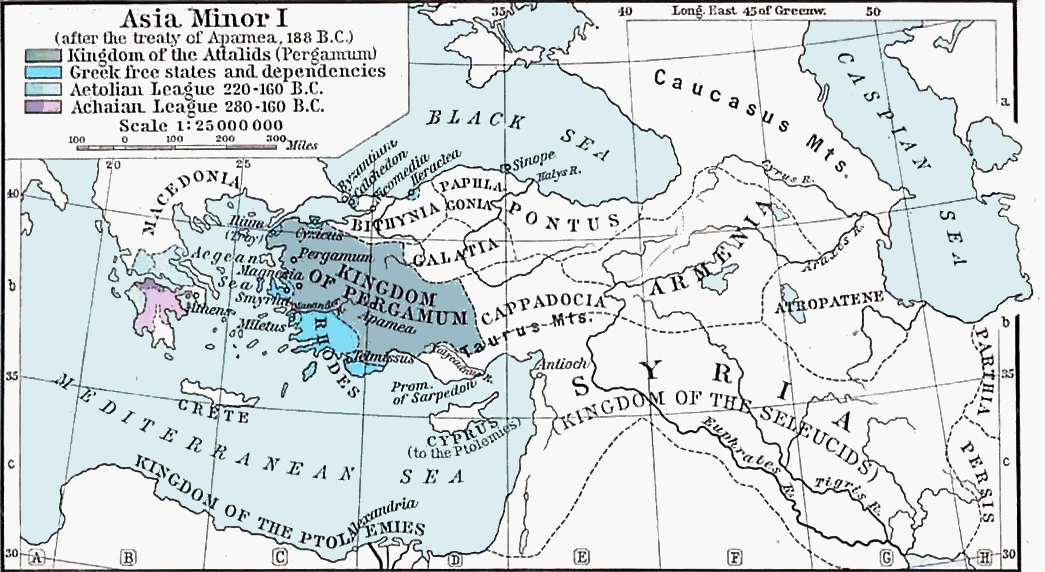
The Attalid kingdom (colored olive) shown at its greatest extent in 188 BCE

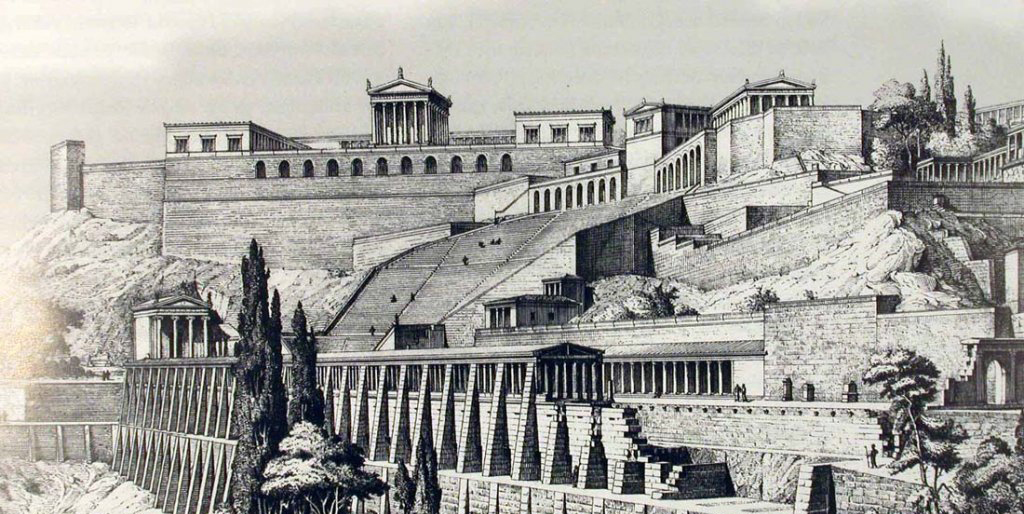
View of the Acropolis of ancient Pergamon, drawn by 19th-century German archaeologists

Founded sometime during the 3rd century BCE, during the Hellenistic Age, Pergamum or Pergamon was an important ancient Greek city, located in Anatolia. It is now the site of the modern Turkish town of Bergama, in the İzmir Province of western Turkey. Ruled by the Attalid dynasty from 281 to 133 BCE, the city rose to prominence as an administrative center under King Eumenes II, who formed an alliance with the Roman Republic, severing ties with Macedonia.

Under the rule of Eumenes II (197–160 BCE), Pergamum was a wealthy, developing city with a population of over 200,000 people. Culturally it was rivaled only by the cities of Alexandria and Antioch. Many important works of sculpture and architecture were produced at this time, including the Great Altar of Pergamon. Upon the death of Attalus III, son of Eumenes II, in 133 BCE, Pergamum was bequeathed to the Roman Republic and then became part of the Roman province of Asia.

Pergamum was also an important city in the New Testament and was explicitly mentioned by John of Patmos as one of the Seven churches of Asia in the Book of Revelation. The ruins of Pergamum and its library are now major archaeological sites in Turkey.

== The Library of Pergamum ==
Pergamum was home to a library said to house approximately 200,000 volumes, according to the writings of Plutarch. Built by Eumenes II between 220 and 159 BCE and situated at the northern end of the Acropolis, it became one of the most important libraries in the ancient world. The cultured Pergamene rulers built up the library to be second only to the Great Library at Alexandria. Flavia Melitene, who was a distinguished citizen of Pergamum and wife of a town councillor, was instrumental in supplying the library. She also presented a statue of the Roman Emperor Hadrian to the library as a gift. It is known that a certain Artemon was employed in the library during the 2nd century BCE, though his personification is obscure. No index or catalog of the holdings at Pergamum exists today, making it impossible to know the true size or scope of this collection.

The library consisted of four rooms, the largest of which was the main reading room (44.5 ft × 50 ft (13.6 m × 15.2 m)), lined with many shelves. An empty space of approximately 50 cm (20 in) was left between the outer walls and the shelves to allow for air circulation, intending to prevent the library from becoming overly humid in the warm climate of Anatolia, an early attempt at library preservation. A 3 m (9.8 ft) statue of the Greek goddess Athena, modeled after her statue in the Parthenon, stood in the main reading room.

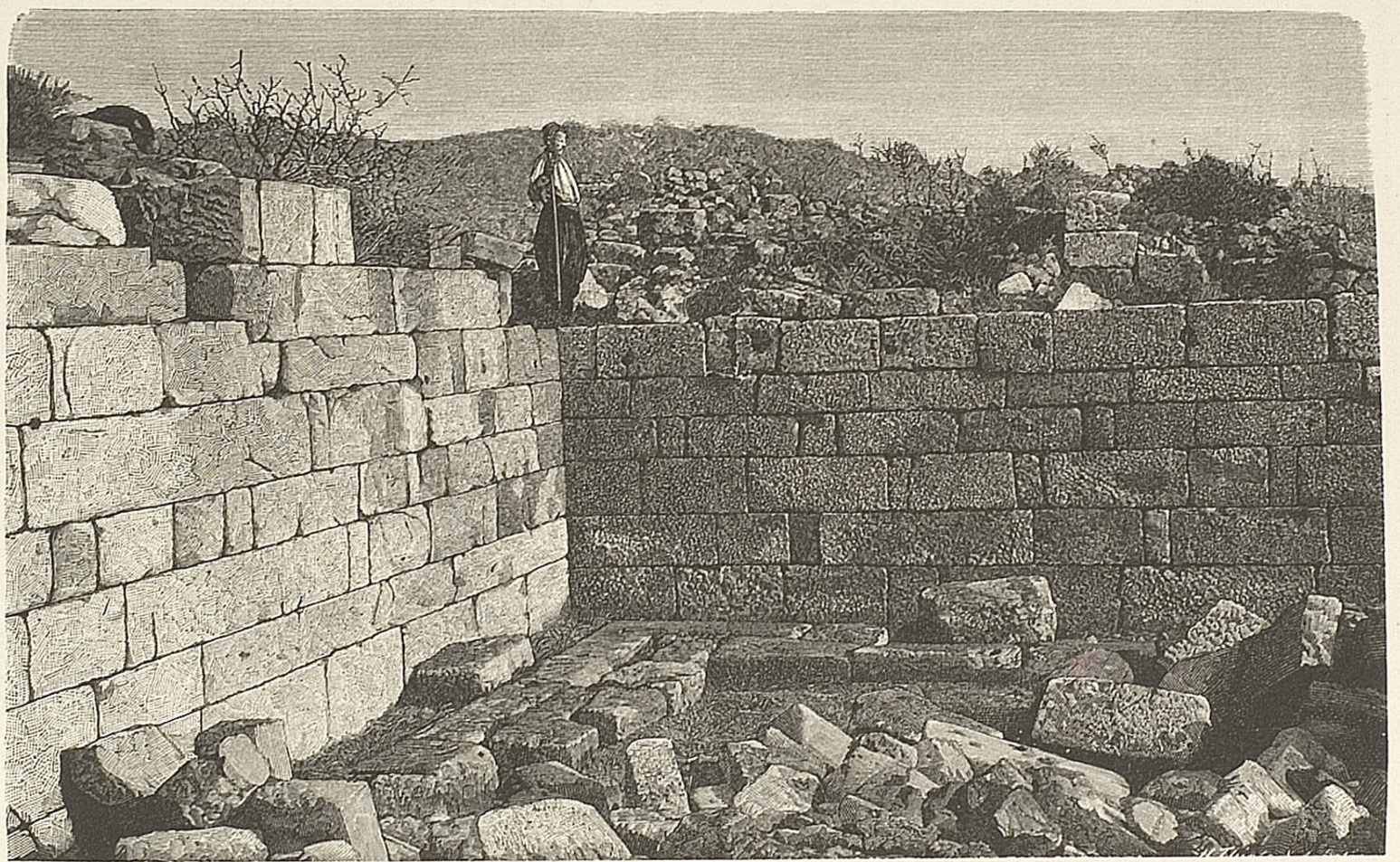
Library of Pergamum before excavation, 1885

Manuscripts were written on parchment, rolled, and then stored on the shelves. In fact, the word "parchment" itself is derived from Pergamum (via the Latin pergamenum and the French parchemin). Pergamum was a thriving center of parchment production during the Hellenistic period. The city so dominated the trade that a legend later arose indicating that parchment had been invented in Pergamon to replace the use of papyrus, which had become monopolized by the rival city of Alexandria. This however is a myth; parchment had been in use in Anatolia and elsewhere long before the rise of Pergamon. Parchment reduced the Roman Empire's dependency on Egyptian papyrus and allowed for the increased dissemination of knowledge throughout Roman-dominated Europe and Asia.

== Competition ==
Although the library of Pergamum was built roughly a century after the library of Alexandria, the two had a fierce rivalry, as libraries were often used to reflect wealth and culture. The two libraries competed for parchment, books, and even literary interpretation. Pergamum also hired some Homeric scholars, who studied the Iliad and the Odyssey. This resulted in a fierce rivalry in which each library tried to obtain copies of Homer's works, striving to have the most accurate and oldest works. They also tried to attract better scholars by offering competitive pay. Ultimately, this rivalry forced both libraries to innovate and improve.

== Decline ==
The Attalid kingdom was annexed to the Roman Republic in 133 BCE and the library grew neglected. According to a legend relayed by Plutarch, the Roman general Mark Antony seized the collection of 200,000 rolls and presented them as a gift to his new wife Cleopatra, Queen of the Ptolemaic Kingdom of Egypt, in 43 BCE, presumably in an effort to restock the Library of Alexandria, which had been damaged during Julius Caesar's Alexandrian Campaign.

Roman Emperor Augustus returned some of the rolls to Pergamum after the death of Mark Antony, and the library remained extant well into late antiquity, though it was not mentioned much by later historians, indicating its collection was no longer significant. The city of Pergamum suffered extensive damage from a severe earthquake in 262 CE, and was subsequently sacked by the Goths. The library did not survive this period of turmoil. The ruins of the library sit on a hilltop near the Sanctuary of Athena and other buildings of the Acropolis of ancient Pergamon.
