= 273 BC =

273 BC in various calendars
Gregorian calendar	273 BC; CCLXXIII BC
Ab urbe condita	481
Ancient Egypt era	XXXIII dynasty, 51
Pharaoh	Ptolemy II Philadelphus, 11
Ancient Greek Olympiad (summer)	126th Olympiad, year 4
Assyrian calendar	4478
Balinese saka calendar	N/A
Bengali calendar	−866 – −865
Berber calendar	678
Buddhist calendar	272
Burmese calendar	−910
Byzantine calendar	5236–5237
Chinese calendar	丁亥年 (Fire Pig); 2425 or 2218 — to — 戊子年 (Earth Rat); 2426 or 2219
Coptic calendar	−556 – −555
Discordian calendar	894
Ethiopian calendar	−280 – −279
Hebrew calendar	3488–3489
- Hindu calendars
Vikram Samvat	−216 – −215
Shaka Samvat	N/A
Kali Yuga	2828–2829
Holocene calendar	9728
Iranian calendar	894 BP – 893 BP
Islamic calendar	921 BH – 920 BH
Javanese calendar	N/A
Julian calendar	N/A
Korean calendar	2061
Minguo calendar	2184 before ROC 民前2184年
Nanakshahi calendar	−1740
Seleucid era	39/40 AG
Thai solar calendar	270–271
Tibetan calendar	阴火猪年 (female Fire-Pig) −146 or −527 or −1299 — to — 阳土鼠年 (male Earth-Rat) −145 or −526 or −1298

Year 273 BC was a year of the pre-Julian Roman calendar. At the time it was known as the Year of the Consulship of Licinus and Canina (or, less frequently, year 481 Ab urbe condita). The denomination 273 BC for this year has been used since the early medieval period, when the Anno Domini calendar era became the prevalent method in Europe for naming years.

== Events ==
=== By place ===
==== Egypt ====
- Impressed by Rome's defeat of Pyrrhus of Epirus, Pharaoh Ptolemy II Philadelphus sends a friendly embassy. The visit is reciprocated.

==== China ====
- General Bai Qi of the State of Qin attacks the State of Wei and State of Zhou. He captures the city of Huyang and wins three battles, defeating the army of the Zhao general Jia Yan.

== Births ==
- Kōgen, emperor of Japan (d. 158 BC)

== Deaths ==
- Appius Claudius Caecus, Roman politician and consul
- Simeon The Just, Jewish High Priest and one of the last members of the Great Assembly
- Xi of Han, Chinese king of Han (Warring States Period)
