= Stratonicea (Lydia) =

Ancient city in Lydia

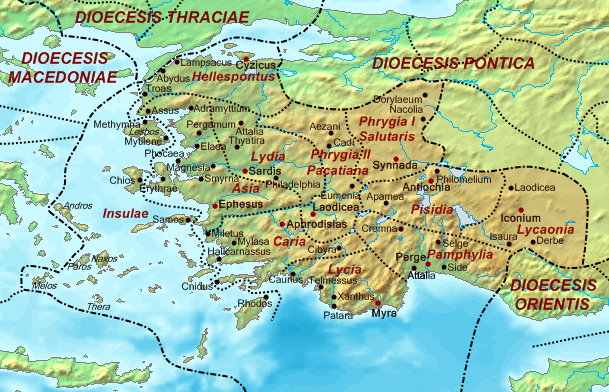
Asia minor 400AD

Stratonicea – (Greek: Στρατoνικεια, or Στρατονίκεια) also transliterated as Stratoniceia and Stratonikeia, earlier Indi, and later for a time Hadrianapolis – was an ancient city in the valley of the Caicus river, between Germe and Acrasus, in Lydia, Anatolia; its site is currently near the village of Siledik, in the district of Kırkağaç, Manisa Province, in the Aegean Region of Turkey.

== Description ==
The foundation of the city dates from the Hellenistic period, probably on the site of an older settlement, Indi. The site of Stratonicea in Lydia exhibits evidence of pre-Hellenistic occupation as a modest Lydian village known as Indi, with settlement layers dating to the 6th through 4th centuries BC. Archaeological surveys in the region indicate that such rural sites typically featured simple pottery, domestic structures, and agricultural tools, reflecting a local economy centered on farming and herding rather than urban trade.

Following the Achaemenid Persian conquest of Lydia in 546 BC, villages like Indi fell under Persian satrapal administration, integrated into the province of Sparda with obligations for tribute and military levies, though rural areas retained significant Lydian cultural continuity. Limited excavations at northern Lydian sites reveal sparse material remains from this era, including grey wares and terracotta figurines, underscoring the area's peripheral role in the satrapy's economy. The inhabitants of Stratonicea and of the adjacent plain of the upper Caicus valley bore originally the name of Indi - (Greek: Ινδί). This we gather from coins of the time of Trajan and Hadrian.

The name Stratonicea was doubtlessly conferred upon the town by Eumenes II in honour of his wife Stratonice, and shortly after this event, circ. B.C. 186, Cistophori were struck there in the name of king Eumenes. One source names Eumenes II as the founder, who named the city after his wife, Stratonice. However, as several Seleucid leaders also had wives named "Stratonice", the identification of the actual founder is not unchallenged. In antiquity, Stratonicea minted its own coins from the late 2nd century BC irregularly until the reign of Gallienus, in the mid-3rd century AD. By 130 BC, Thyatira had annexed the city which had become merely a village. Stratonicea regained importance during Trajan's reign. Emperor Hadrian renamed the city Hadrianopolis after himself. Archaeological finds from the site are preserved in a museum in Manisa.

== Bishopric ==
The ancient bishopric of Stratonicea in Lydia is included in the Catholic Church's list of titular sees. The only titular bishop of the see was Alphonse Bermyn, who was appointed on 15 April 1901 and died on 16 February 1915.

Known Bishops

- Eutherius of Stratonicea, signed Council of Ephesus.
- Alphonse Bermyn, (15 Apr 1901 Appointed - 16 Feb 1915)
