= Ariaramnes of Cappadocia =

King of Cappadocia from 280 BC to 230 BC

Ariaramnes
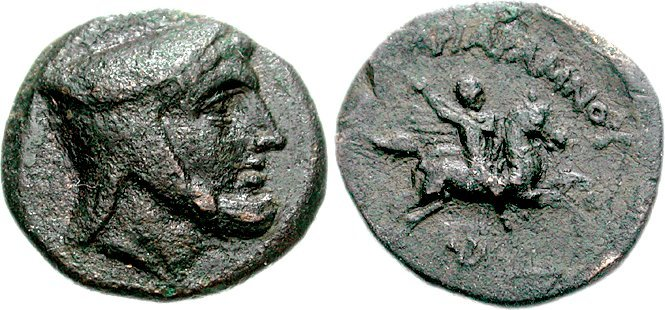
- Coin of Ariaramnes

King of Cappadocia
- Reign: 280–230 BC
- Predecessor: Ariarathes II
- Successor: Ariarathes III
- Died: 230 BC
- Dynasty: Ariarathid
- Father: Ariarathes II

Ariaramnes (Old Persian: 𐎠𐎼𐎡𐎹𐎠𐎼𐎶𐎴 Ariyāramna, Greek: Ἀριάμνης), was the Ariarathid king of Cappadocia from 280 BC to 230 BC. He was the son and successor of Ariarathes II.

Ariaramnes' name is the Greek attestation of an Old Iranian name, Aryārāman ("he who brings peace to the Aryans"). His name is sometimes confused with an akin name, Ariamnes. Ariaramnes minted coins during his reign. On the obverse of his coins, he is portrayed wearing the Persian satrapal tiara, whilst the reverse shows him holding a lance whilst riding a horse.

Although Cappadocia had throughout its history been hardly subjected to Hellenism, it slowly began to affect the region now with order and stability under the Ariarathid dynasty. This can be seen on the engravings of Ariaramnes' coins, who is the first king of his dynasty to mint coins with Greek engravings instead of the traditional Aramaic. On some of these coins the name Tyana is engraved, which indicates that Ariaramnes had conquered the city.

Originally a vassal of the Greek Seleucid Empire, Ariaramnes rebelled and obtained independence. However, he sustained friendly relations with his former suzerains, with one of his daughters marrying prince Antiochus Hierax, and the latter's sister Stratonice marrying Ariaramnes' son Ariarathes (Ariarathes III). Consequently, the Seleucid king Antiochus II Theos (r. 261 – 246 BC) bestowed Ariarathes with the title of "king", who ruled together with Ariaramnes from 255 BC. In 230 BC, Ariaramnes received Antiochus Hierax after the latter had fled from his ruling brother Seleucus II Callinicus (r. 246 – 225 BC). Ariaramnes died around the same period, with Ariarathes becoming the sole ruler of the kingdom.

== Sources ==
- Boyce, Mary; Grenet, Frantz (1991). Beck, Roger (ed.). A History of Zoroastrianism, Zoroastrianism under Macedonian and Roman Rule. Leiden: Brill. ISBN 978-9004293915.
- Raditsa, Leo (1983). "Iranians in Asia Minor". In Yarshater, Ehsan (ed.). The Cambridge History of Iran, Vol. 3 (1): The Seleucid, Parthian and Sasanian periods. Cambridge University Press. ISBN 978-1139054942.
- Shahbazi, A. Shapur (1986). "Ariyāramna". Encyclopaedia Iranica, Vol. II, Fasc. 4. pp. 410–411.

Regnal titles
Preceded by Ariarathes II	King of Cappadocia; 280 – 230 BC	Succeeded by Ariarathes III
