= Blossia gens =

Ancient Roman family

The gens Blossia, also spelled Blosia, was a Roman family of Campanian origin, which came to prominence during the Second Punic War. The most famous member of this gens is probably Gaius Blossius, an intimate friend of Tiberius Sempronius Gracchus, whom he urged to bring forward his agrarian law. He fled from Rome after the murder of Gracchus, and eventually took his own life for fear of falling into the hands of his enemies.

== Members ==
- Marius Blossius, praetor of the Campanians at the time of the revolt of Capua against Rome in 216 BC.
- Blossii, two brothers whose praenomina are not recorded, who attempted to bring about another revolt at Capua in 210 BC, but who were instead captured and put to death.
- Gaius Blossius, a native of Cumae and scholar of philosophy, was a close friend of Tiberius Gracchus, whose agrarian law he encouraged. After Gracchus' death he was denounced, and fled to the protection of Eumenes of Pergamum; but following the latter's downfall, he took his own life to prevent his capture by Roman forces.

== See also ==
- List of Roman gentes

== Bibliography ==
- Marcus Tullius Cicero, De Lege Agraria contra Rullum; Laelius de Amicitia.
- Titus Livius (Livy), History of Rome.
- Valerius Maximus, Factorum ac Dictorum Memorabilium (Memorable Facts and Sayings).
- Lucius Mestrius Plutarchus (Plutarch), Lives of the Noble Greeks and Romans.
- Dictionary of Greek and Roman Biography and Mythology, William Smith, ed., Little, Brown and Company, Boston (1849).
