= Eltynia =

Coordinates: 35°14′21″N 25°12′06″E

Eltynia (Greek: Ἐλτυνία) was a town of ancient Crete. The city is documented through inscriptions, whose earliest testimonies date from the sixth and fifth centuries BCE, among which is a law dealing with offenses committed against young people. It is also mentioned in a list of the Cretan cities cited in a decree of Knossos c. 259-233 BCE, as well as in the list of Cretan cities that signed an alliance with Eumenes II of Pergamon in the year 183 BCE.

Its site is located near modern Kounavoi, Ellinika.
