= Leucae (Ionia) =

Ancient town in Ionia, now modern Turkey

Coordinates: 38°33′34″N 26°51′18″E

Leucae (Greek: Λεῦκαι) or Leuce (Greek: Λεύκη) was a small town of ancient Ionia, in the neighbourhood of Phocaea. Leucae was situated, according to Pliny in promontorio quod insula fuit, or, "on an island promontory." From Scylax we learn that it was a place with harbours. According to Diodorus, the Persian admiral Tachos founded this town on an eminence on the sea coast, in 352 BCE; but shortly after, when Tachos had died, the Clazomenians and Cymaeans quarrelled about its possession, and the former succeeded by a stratagem in making themselves masters of it. At a later time Leucae became remarkable for the battle fought in its neighbourhood between the consul Publius Licinius Crassus Dives Mucianus and Aristonicus in 131 BCE. Some have supposed this place to be identical with the Leuconium mentioned by Thucydides; but this is impossible, as this latter place must be looked for in Chios. The site of the ancient Leucae is at Üçtepeler, İzmir Province, Turkey, some distance from the coast. Coins were minted at Leucae in the 3rd century BCE.

== Literature ==
- D. Magie, Roman Rule in Asia Minor (1950) p. 1035.
- G. E. Bean, Aegean Turkey (1966) pp. 125–27.
