= Gaius Blossius =

Ancient philosopher

Gaius Blossius (/ˈɡaɪ.əs ˈblɒsiəs/; 2nd century BC) was, according to Plutarch, a philosopher and student of the Stoic philosopher Antipater of Tarsus, from the city of Cumae in Campania, Italy, who (along with the Greek rhetorician, Diophanes) instigated Roman tribune Tiberius Gracchus to pursue a land reform movement on behalf of the plebs. Tiberius was accused by his political opponents of attempting to provoke a popular uprising, and have himself crowned King. Eventually, he was assassinated, and his body thrown into the river Tiber.

After the death of Tiberius Gracchus, Blossius was interrogated by the consuls on the matter. Blossius freely admitted that he had done anything Tiberius had asked. The consuls asked "What? What would you do if Tiberius ordered you to burn the Capitol?" He answered that Tiberius would never have given such an order. Being pressed on the point, though, Blossius eventually stated that Tiberius would only have ordered such a thing, if it were in the true interests of the Roman people. After that, he was released. Blossius went to the province of Asia, where he took part in Aristonicus' popular uprising against Rome, aiding in the organization of the Heliopolis state. When the uprising was ultimately defeated, he killed himself.

== In literature ==
Blossius is a sympathetic character in Steven Saylor's novel Roma. Saylor follows the known facts of Blossius' life, but adds a long-lasting love relationship between him and a Patrician Roman woman, which is not attested in historical sources.

== See also ==
- Blossia (gens)
