= Andronicus of Pergamum =

2nd-century BCE ambassador for Attalus II of Pergamum

Andronicus of Pergamum (Greek: Άνδρόνικος) was an ambassador of Attalus II Philadelphus. He was sent to Rome in 156 BCE, to inform the Roman Senate that Prusias II of Bithynia had attacked the territories of Attalus.

Prusias later sent his son Nicomedes II of Bithynia, along with an assistant named Menas, to Rome in 149 to appeal to the Senate, and ask them to cancel the fine they had earlier levied on Prusias for attacking Attalus. Unbeknownst to Nicomedes, Menas had been given orders to assassinate Nicomedes if he failed. Attalus again sent Andronicus to Rome, to oppose this diplomatic request, and demonstrate why the fine was fair.

Menas, seeing that Nicomedes would fail, but was also too popular at Rome to assassinate, feared to either carry out his mission or return to Prusias if he did not carry it out. He called Nicomedes and Andronicus into a meeting and explained the plot to them, and in which the three conspired against Prusias, with the end goal of replacing Prusias on the throne with Nicomedes. Though it is speculated by some scholars that winning over the heir to the Bithynian throne was already part of Andronicus's agenda at that point.

The three set sail from Ostia Antica and met at the city of Berenice, in Epirus, where Andronicus and his soldiers hailed Nicomedes as king of Bithynia, and promised the assistance of Attalus.
