= Siledik =

- Neighbourhood
- Location in Turkey Siledik (Turkey Aegean)
- Coordinates: 39°09′N 27°47′E
- Country: Turkey
- Province: Manisa
- District: Kırkağaç
- Population (2022): 82
- Time zone: UTC+3 (TRT)

Siledik is a neighbourhood of the municipality and district of Kırkağaç, Manisa Province, Turkey. Its population is 82 (2022).

== History ==
The ancient name of the village is Stratonicea. Founded in the Seleucid Empire, it was named after the Stratonikea in western Anatolia. It was one of two such cities. The other Stratonicea was located in Ancient Caria, current Muğla Province.

Archaeology excavations of the ancient town have been started.

== Geography ==
Kırkağaç town is located 9 kilometres (5.6 mi) away. The climate of the village is in the Mediterranean climate domain.

== Population ==
Historical population
Year	Pop.	±% p.a.
1997	203	—
2007	139	−3.72%
2012	119	−3.06%
2017	101	−3.23%
2022	82	−4.08%
Source: 1997 census and TÜIK (2007-2022)

== Economy ==
The economy of a village depends on agriculture and husbandry.
