= Attalus III =

Last king of Pergamon from 138 to 133 BC

Attalus III Philometor Euergetes
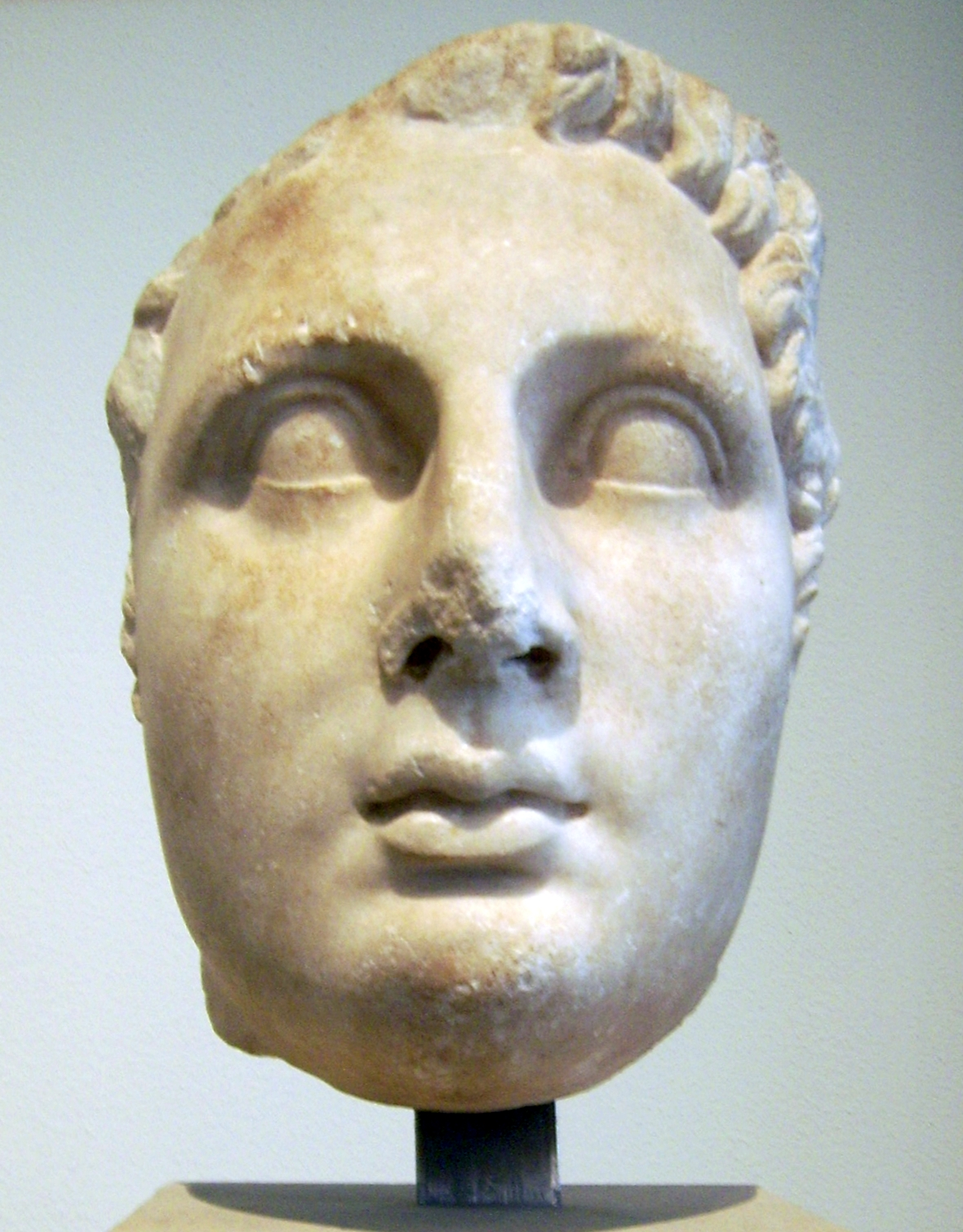
- Attalus III (or II), 150/152 BC from Antikensammlung in Berlin.

King of Pergamon
- Reign: 138–133 BC
- Predecessor: Attalus II
- Successor: Eumenes III
- Born: c. 170 BC
- Died: 133 BC
- Greek: Άτταλος Γ΄ Φιλομήτωρ Ευεργέτης
- House: Attalid dynasty
- Father: Eumenes II
- Mother: Stratonice of Cappadocia
- Religion: Greek Polytheism

Attalus III (Greek: Ἄτταλος Γ΄) Philometor Euergetes (c. 170 BC – 133 BC) was the last Attalid king of Pergamon, ruling from 138 BC to 133 BC.

== Biography ==
Attalus III was the son of king Eumenes II and his queen Stratonice of Cappadocia, and he was the nephew of Attalus II, whom he succeeded. "Philometor Euergetes" means "Loving-his-Mother, Benefactor" in Greek; he was so-called because of his close relationship with his mother Stratonice. He is the likely addressee of a fragmentary hymn by the poet Nicander which celebrates his heritage.

According to Livy, Attalus III had little interest in ruling Pergamon, devoting his time to studying medicine, botany, gardening, and other pursuits. He had no male children or heirs of his own, and in his will he left his kingdom to the Roman Republic, believing that if he did not then Rome would take the kingdom anyway and this way would avoid bloodshed. Tiberius Gracchus requested that the treasury of Pergamon be opened up to the Roman public to pay for his land reform, but the Senate refused this.

Not everyone in Pergamon accepted Rome's rule. In 131 BC Aristonicus, who claimed to be Attalus' brother as well as the son of Eumenes II, an earlier king, led a popular uprising with the help of the Roman philosopher Blossius. He ruled as Eumenes III. The revolt was put down in 129 BC, and Pergamon was divided among Rome, Pontus, and Cappadocia.

== Notes ==
Regnal titles
Preceded by Attalus II	King of Pergamon; 138–133 BC	Succeeded by Eumenes III
