= Eumenes III =

(Aristonicus) Eumenes III
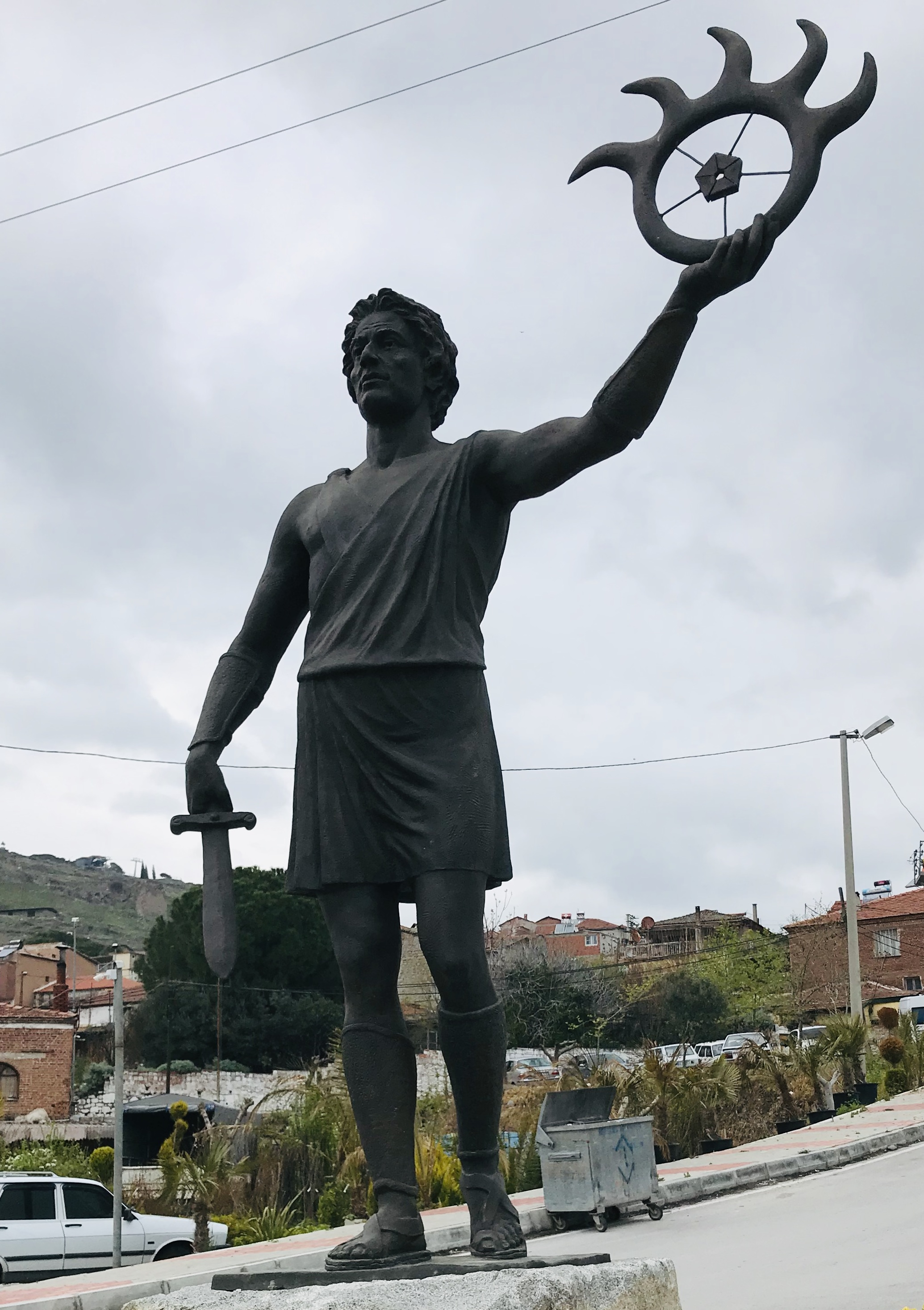
- The statue of Eumenes III in Bergama, İzmir, Turkey

King of Pergamon
- Reign: 133–129 BC
- Predecessor: Attalus III
- Successor: Roman conquest
- Died: 129 BC; Tullianum Prison, Rome
- Greek: (Αριστόνικος) Ευμένης Γ΄
- House: Attalid dynasty
- Father: Eumenes II (?)
- Mother: unknown
- Religion: Greek Polytheism

Eumenes III (/juːˈmɛniːz/; Ancient Greek: Εὐμένης Γʹ; (died 129 BC) originally named Aristonicus; in Greek Aristonikos Ἀριστόνικος) was a pretender to the throne of Pergamon. He led the revolt against the Pergamene regime and found success early on, seizing various cities near the coast of Anatolia, including the island of Samos, and killing the Roman Consul Publius Licinius Crassus Dives Mucianus. However, the revolt was eventually quelled by the Roman Republic in 129 BC when it dispatched the experienced Marcus Perperna to the region.

== Staking his Claim ==
When the Pergamene king, Attalus III, died in 133 BC, he bequeathed his kingdom to the Romans. Though he stipulated that Pergamum and the rest of the Greek cities were exempt from this bequest, it mattered little to the Romans, with Tiberius Gracchus in particular eager to take advantage of this gift to fund his ambitious land reforms. As a result of the turmoil that stemmed from Gracchus encroaching on the prerogative of the Senate by attempting to use his power as the Tribune of the Plebs to allocate the bequest to the funding of his new laws, the Romans were slow in securing their claim. Aristonicus, who claimed to be the illegitimate son of the earlier Pergamene king, Eumenes II (197–160 BC), father of Attalus III, took advantage of the uncertainty and laid claim to the throne, taking the dynastic name, Eumenes III.

== Revolt ==
Eumenes’ revolt was met with staunch opposition, coming not only from the Romans but also from the surrounding Greek cities. Indeed, in the earlier stages of the revolt, much of the conflict came against the Greek cities of the Anatolian coast. According to Strabo, Eumenes successfully convinced Leucae to revolt and only left the region after being driven out by defeat to the Ephesians in a naval battle off the coast of Cyme. Before being expelled from the area he had taken Samos, Myndus and Colophon in sea raids, and crucially, the Roman consul dispatched to put an end to his revolt, Publius Licinius Crassus Dives Mucianus, was killed after an attempt to take back Leucae.

Eumenes then sought support in the interior, promising freedom to both slaves and serfs whom he referred to as 'heliopolitae'. It was the serfs, who comprised most of the workers in the interior, who were more receptive to his message; his ideals failed to take hold in cities, where the slaves were concentrated. However the extent to which he was a social revolutionary or simply a dynastic contender to the throne is uncertain, with desperation rather than a genuine desire at reform perhaps motivating his offer of freedom. Nevertheless, he initially found success in the interior, seizing Thyatira as well as Apollonis. His cause was also furthered by the death of Ariarathes V of Cappadocia, who, along with Mithridates V of Pontus, Nicomedes II of Bithynia, and Pylaemenes of Paphlagonia, opposed the revolt in the hopes of winning the favor of Rome. It was around this time that he was joined by Blossius of Cumae, the Stoic, who had been a supporter of Tiberius Gracchus and promised to found a state called Heliopolis in which all were to be free.

== Downfall ==
Despite these gains, the revolt was dealt a blow in 130 BC by the appointment of Crassus’ successor: Marcus Perperna. The consul had prior experience with putting down slave revolts in Sicily, and the Romans reaped the rewards of this experience as Perperna, according to Justinus, subdued Eumenes in their first encounter. Though the location of this encounter is disputed, it is thought to be Stratonicea on the Caicus in Lydia. Here, the revolt came to an end, with Eumenes being starved into submission and sent, alive, to Rome. His most prominent ally, Blossius, intimately aware of the wrath Rome would bring down upon him, killed himself.

After Eumenes arrived in Rome, he was paraded through the city, then executed by strangulation in the Tullianum prison. Perperna's successor in Asia, Manius Aquillius, subsequently oversaw the organisation of the area, dividing the Pergamene kingdom among Rome, Pontus, and Cappadocia.

Regnal titles
Preceded by Attalus III	King of Pergamon; 133–129 BC	Succeeded by Roman conquest
