= Leuconium =

Town in Greece

Leuconium or Leukonion (Ancient Greek: Λευκώνιον) was a town of ancient Greece on the island of Chios.

Its site is unlocated.
