= AD 158 =

158 in various calendars
- Gregorian calendar: 158; CLVIII
- Ab urbe condita: 911
- Assyrian calendar: 4908
- Balinese saka calendar: 79–80
- Bengali calendar: −436 – −435
- Berber calendar: 1108
- Buddhist calendar: 702
- Burmese calendar: −480
- Byzantine calendar: 5666–5667
- Chinese calendar: 丁酉年 (Fire Rooster); 2855 or 2648 — to — 戊戌年 (Earth Dog); 2856 or 2649
- Coptic calendar: −126 – −125
- Discordian calendar: 1324
- Ethiopian calendar: 150–151
- Hebrew calendar: 3918–3919
- Hindu calendars
- Vikram Samvat: 214–215
- Shaka Samvat: 79–80
- Kali Yuga: 3258–3259
- Holocene calendar: 10158
- Iranian calendar: 464 BP – 463 BP
- Islamic calendar: 478 BH – 477 BH
- Javanese calendar: 34–35
- Julian calendar: 158; CLVIII
- Korean calendar: 2491
- Minguo calendar: 1754 before ROC 民前1754年
- Nanakshahi calendar: −1310
- Seleucid era: 469/470 AG
- Thai solar calendar: 700–701
- Tibetan calendar: མེ་མོ་བྱ་ལོ་ (female Fire-Bird); 284 or −97 or −869 — to — ས་ཕོ་ཁྱི་ལོ་ (male Earth-Dog); 285 or −96 or −868

Year 158 (CLVIII) was a common year starting on Saturday of the Julian calendar. At the time, it was known as the Year of the Consulship of Tertullus and Sacerdos (or, less frequently, year 911 Ab urbe condita). The denomination 158 for this year has been used since the early medieval period, when the Anno Domini calendar era became the prevalent method in Europe for naming years.

== Events ==
=== By place ===
==== Roman Empire ====
- The earliest dated use of Sol Invictus, in a dedication from Rome.
- A revolt against Roman rule in Dacia is crushed.

==== China ====
- Change of era name from Yongshou to Yangxi of the Chinese Han dynasty.

== Births ==
- Gaius Caesonius Macer Rufinianus, Roman politician (d. 237)

== Deaths ==
- Wang Yi, Chinese librarian and poet (b. AD 89)
