= Orophernes of Cappadocia =

2nd-century BC king of Cappadocia

Orophernes Nicephorus
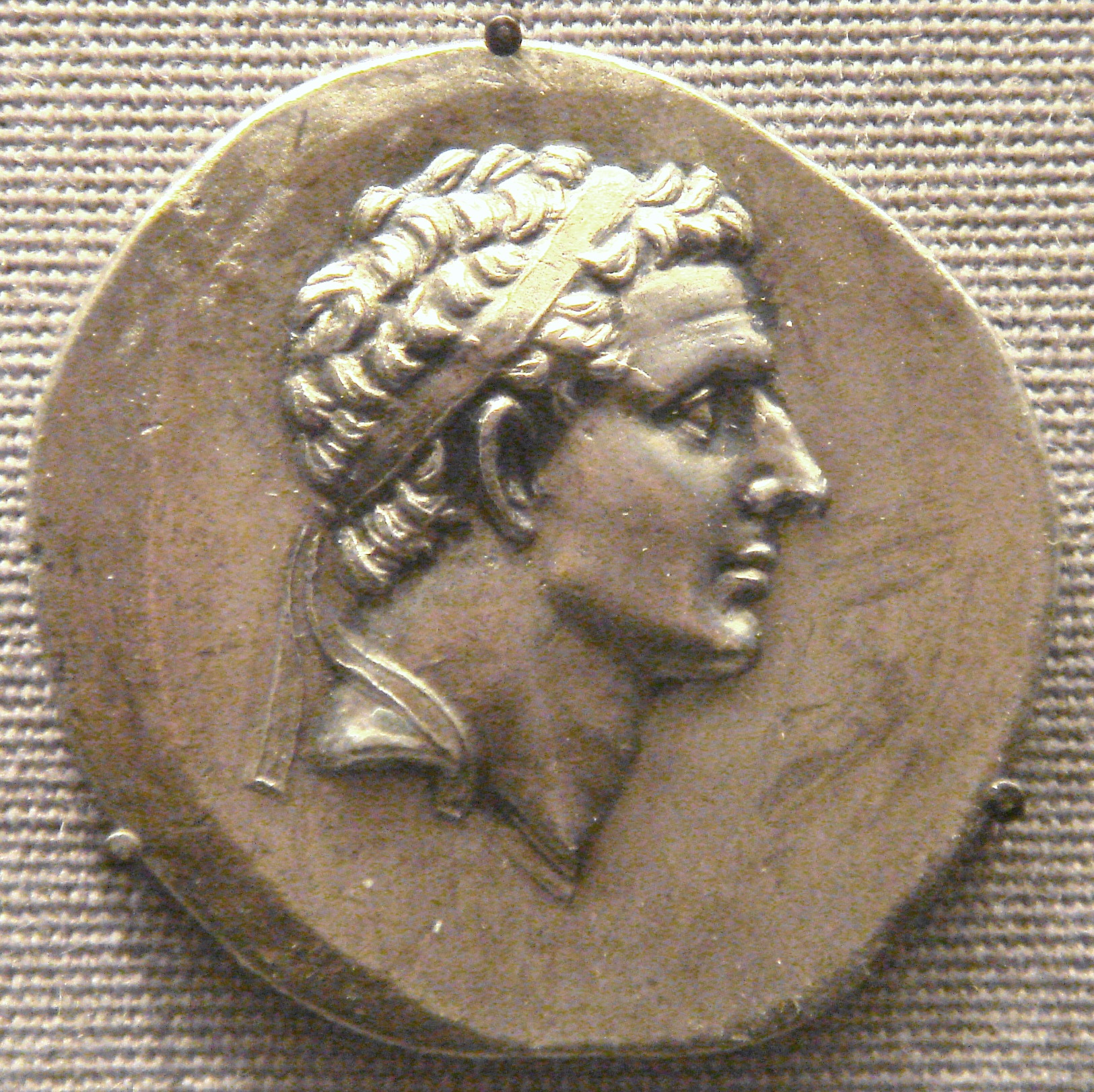
- Tetradrachm of Orophernes; British Museum

King of Cappadocia
- Reign: 159–157 BC
- Predecessor: Ariarathes V
- Successor: Ariarathes V
- Died: Uncertain date after 157 BC
- Dynasty: Ariarathid
- Father: Biological father unknown; purported father Ariarathes IV
- Mother: Biological mother unknown; purported mother Antiochis
- Religion: Greek Polytheism

Orophernes Nicephorus (Ancient Greek: Oρoφέρνης Nικηφόρoς, romanized: Orophérnēs Nikēphóros; also known as Olophernes) was one of the two sons Antiochis (the daughter of Antiochus III the Great) pretended to have had with Ariarathes IV, the king of Cappadocia because she failed to have children (the name of the other was Ariarathes). However, she then did bear a child, Mithridates, and told her husband about the fake sons. These were sent to Rome and Ionia respectively to avoid a succession dispute with the legitimate son, whose name was changed to Ariarathes and who succeeded his father as Ariarathes V in 163 BC. A few years later Orophernes deposed him with the help of Demetrius I Soter, who became the king of the Syria-based Seleucid Empire in 162 BC when he overthrew Antiochus V, an underage king, and his regent, Lysias. The reign of Orophernes was short-lived. The Romans restored Ariarathes V.

The information we have about Orophernes comes from Justin, Diodorus Siculus and Polybius, whose works have survived in fragments. Therefore, this information is incomplete. We also have very brief references to Orophernes in Appian and Zonaras.

== Reign ==
According to Justin, when Ariarathes V refused to marry the sister of Demetrius I, the latter welcomed Orophernes, who had come to him as a suppliant, and supported his claim to the throne of Cappadocia. For Demetrius this was a pretext for war as he wanted to enlarge his kingdom and increase his power by waging war on his neighbours. However, Orophernes plotted with the disgruntled people of Antioch to expel him. The conspiracy was discovered. Demetrius spared his life so that he could still pursue the war against Ariarathes V. He captured him and imprisoned at Seleucia, in his kingdom. The people of Antioch persisted with their rebellion. They were attacked by Demetrius, but they were supported by Ptolemy VI, the king of the Ptolemaic Kingdom of Egypt, Attalus II, the king of Pergamon, and Ariarathes V. They sent Balas, a young man, to pretend that he was the brother of Antiochus V and claim the throne by force. They called him Alexander (see Alexander Balas). The people believed him. He defeated Demetrius, who died in battle.

Justin's brief account did not mention the deposition of Ariarathes V. This is recorded in the Periochae of Livy where an entry for book 47 says that "King Ariarathes of Cappadocia, who had been expelled from his kingdom on the initiative and with troops of king Demetrius..."

Appian wrote that Demetrius deposed Ariarathes V and gave the throne of Cappadocia to Olophernes, who gave Demetrius 1000 talents for this.

Diodorus Siculus wrote that Orophernes overthrew Ariarathes V and did not try to gain popular support. He raised money through forced contributions. He put many people to death. He gave Timotheus a gift of 50 talents and Demetrius a gift of 70 talents in addition to having paid him 600 talents and still owing him 400 talents (this is probably the money Appian said he paid Demetrius to overthrow Ariarathes). He began to make exactions on all his subjects and to confiscate the property of men "of the highest distinction." It is at this point that Balas (Diodorus did not give his name and only says that he was a youth who resembled Antiochus V) was sent to challenge Demetrius. In this account he was from Smyrna and he was sent by Attalus II, who was aggrieved by the expulsion of Ariarathes V and also had reasons for wanting to keep Demetrius in check. He gave him royal insignia and sent him to Zenophanes, a Cilician who had had a dispute with Demetrius and had been helped by Eumenes II, Attalus' father. This man spread the word that the youth wanted to reclaim his father's throne.

In Polybius's account, Ariarathes V arrived in Rome in the summer of 158 BC. After the consuls for 157 BC, Sextus Julius Caesar and Lucius Aurelius Orestes, entered office he did some lobbying. He and his retinue dressed modestly to highlight his distressed situation. Miltiades arrived as an envoy of Demetrius to defend Demetrius and speak against Ariarathes. Orophernes sent a delegation headed by Timotheus and Diogenes to plead Orophernes' case and accuse Ariarathes V. They brought a crown dedicated to Rome, which was a way of pledging allegiance to Rome, and asked to renew Cappadocia's alliance with Rome. The lobbying of this delegation made a greater impression because it outnumbered Ariarathes, it appeared more prosperous and it disregarded truth. Since there was no one to refute falsehoods, it gained the day. However, in another passage, Polybius wrote that Ariobarzanes was restored and left Italy. Orophernes and Theotimus blamed each other for this. In another passage he summarised that Ariarathes was expelled by Orophernes through "the agency of King Demetrius" and recovered his throne "by the help of Attalus." He also noted that after Attalus succeeded his brother Eumenes his policy was to restore Ariarathes to his kingdom.

That Ariarathes V was restored as sole ruler of Cappadocia rather than being ordered to be a co-ruler with his alleged brother, is recorded in the Periochae: "King Ariarathes of Cappadocia... was restored by the Senate.

Diodorus Siculus wrote that the envoys of Orophernes plotted against Ariarathes V, but the latter captured them and put them to death at Corfu, an island off western Greece. The henchmen of Orophernes made plans against Ariarathes at Corinth, in Greece. However, Ariarathes eluded them and reached Attalus in Pergamon safely.

Unlike Polybius and Diodorus Siculus, Appian wrote the Romans "decided that as brothers both Ariarathes and Orophernes should reign together."

Zonaras, too, wrote that the Romans ruled that Ariarathes VI and Orophernes were to be co-rulers. His account also has Orophernes as the only child of Antiochis and Ariarathes IV prior to the birth of Ariarathes V. Antiochis adopted Orophernes. There is no mention of another adoptive son. When Ariobarzanes V was born, the position of Orophernes was "detected and he was banished." In his brief mention of Ariarathes VI and Orophernes, Zonaras went on to write that Orophernes deposed Ariarathes V by leading an uprising and defeating him. Attalus II was an ally of Ariarathes and Demetrius was an ally of Orophernes. The Romans decided that the two brothers were to share the kingdom. Subsequently, the fact Ariarathes V had been declared an ally of Rome enabled him to overthrow Orophernes and became the sole ruler. When Attalus II succeed Eumenes II after his death, he drove Orophernes and Demetrius out of Cappadocia. Polybius related that soon after his succession to the throne in 163 BC, Ariarathes sent envoys to Rome to renew “the previously existing alliance.” This is also recorded in the Periochae.

Polybius wrote that Orophernes did not hold the kingdom for long. He thought that Orophernes despised traditional Cappadocian customs and "introduced the refined debauchery of Ionia." He lost his kingdom and life because he fell victim to the passion for money and sacrificed his life for this. This view was echoed by Athenaeus, who regarded the Ionian luxury Orophernes introduced as being artificial.

Polybius wrote that Orophernes, who had amassed a great sum, deposited 400 talents in the city of Priene for a rainy day. The town later returned the money. In another passage he wrote that after he was restored, Ariarathes V, who thought that the money belonged to the kingdom, asked Priene to return the money to him. The town refused to give it to anyone else while Orophernes was alive. Ariarathes sent a force to devastate its territory. Priene, which had sent envoys to Rhodes, now appealed to the Romans, who ignored this. Polybius commented that "[t]he Prienians had based high hopes on their command of so large a sum but the result was just the opposite. For they paid the deposit back to Orophernes, and unjustly suffered considerable damage at the hands of King Ariarathes owing to this same deposit."

According to Diodorus Siculus, when Orophernes' situation worsened, he was worried about the pay for his soldiers and was afraid about a possible mutiny. Since he was without funds, he plundered a temple of Zeus, which was considered inviolable, to pay the wage arrears.

== Legacy ==
Today Orophernes is mainly known for a poem written by the celebrated modern Greek poet Constantine P. Cavafy in 1915. In meditating on a tetradrachm found in Priene, the poet wrote "Orophernes," on the pretender's life and his adventures. Only nine tetradrachms bearing the portrait of Orophernes are known to exist and numismatists regard them as the pinnacle of Hellenistic portrait coinage. The highest price achieved at auction was £200,000.
