= 121 BC =

121 BC in various calendars
- Gregorian calendar: 121 BC; CXXI BC
- Ab urbe condita: 633
- Ancient Egypt era: XXXIII dynasty, 203
- Pharaoh: Ptolemy VIII Physcon, 25
- Ancient Greek Olympiad (summer): 164th Olympiad, year 4
- Assyrian calendar: 4630
- Balinese saka calendar: N/A
- Bengali calendar: −714 – −713
- Berber calendar: 830
- Buddhist calendar: 424
- Burmese calendar: −758
- Byzantine calendar: 5388–5389
- Chinese calendar: 己未年 (Earth Goat); 2577 or 2370 — to — 庚申年 (Metal Monkey); 2578 or 2371
- Coptic calendar: −404 – −403
- Discordian calendar: 1046
- Ethiopian calendar: −128 – −127
- Hebrew calendar: 3640–3641
- Hindu calendars
- Vikram Samvat: −64 – −63
- Shaka Samvat: N/A
- Kali Yuga: 2980–2981
- Holocene calendar: 9880
- Iranian calendar: 742 BP – 741 BP
- Islamic calendar: 765 BH – 764 BH
- Javanese calendar: N/A
- Julian calendar: N/A
- Korean calendar: 2213
- Minguo calendar: 2032 before ROC 民前2032年
- Nanakshahi calendar: −1588
- Seleucid era: 191/192 AG
- Thai solar calendar: 422–423
- Tibetan calendar: ས་མོ་ལུག་ལོ་ (female Earth-Sheep); 6 or −375 or −1147 — to — ལྕགས་ཕོ་སྤྲེ་ལོ་ (male Iron-Monkey); 7 or −374 or −1146

Year 121 BC was a year of the pre-Julian Roman calendar. At the time it was known as the Year of the Consulship of Opimius and Allobrogicus (or, less frequently, year 633 Ab urbe condita) and the Second Year of Yuanshou. The denomination 121 BC for this year has been used since the early medieval period, when the Anno Domini calendar era became the prevalent method in Europe for naming years.

== Events ==
=== By place ===
==== Roman Republic ====
- The Roman Senate passes the motion senatus consultum ultimum, which the consul Lucius Opimius interprets as giving him unlimited power to preserve the Republic. He gathers an armed force of Senators and their supporters to confront Gaius Gracchus. A pitched battle is fought inside Rome, resulting in the death of Gracchus and many of his followers.
- A tribunal is established in Rome that executes 3,000 followers of Gracchus.
- Consul Quintus Fabius Maximus, allied with the Aedui, defeats the Arverni and Allobroges in Transalpine Gaul, thus establishing the province for Rome.
- The finest vintage of Falernian wine, known as the Opimian vintage, is bottled from vines grown on Mt Falernus between Latium and Campania.

==== China ====
- Spring - The Han general Huo Qubing attacks the Supu, vassals of the Xiongnu, and kills their king. He then invades the Hexi Corridor, where he fights a six-day running battle against a son of Yizhixie Chanyu. The Xiongnu are defeated, and the ruler of Lan and king Lu, both vassals of the Xiongnu, are killed in the fighting. Huo Qubing then attacks and defeats the Hunye, capturing the son of the Hunye king and his ministers and chief commandants.
- Summer - Huo Qubing again invades the Hexi Corridor. In an engagement in the Qilian Mountains, he captures the king of the Qiutu. In a second engagement, he then captures five vassal kings of the Xiongnu and a consort of the Chanyu, killing or capturing more than 30,000 Xiongnu soldiers.
- Generals Li Guang and Zhang Qian ride north from Youbeiping, but Zhang Qian, with the larger army, is slow to rendezvous with Li Guang. As a result, Li Guang loses more than half his army in battle against the Tuqi (Worthy Prince) of the Left (East).
- Autumn - Yizhixie Chanyu plans on executing the Hunye and Xiutu kings for their failures against Huo Qubing, but learning of this, the vassal kings inform the Han of their intention to surrender. Emperor Wu of Han sends Huo Qubing across the Yellow River with an army to oversee their surrender. Some of the enemy troops and leaders then refuse to surrender, but Huo Qubing massacres 8000 of them as they attempt to flee. Huo Qubing receives the surrender of thirty-two Xiongnu vassals, and the Hunye king and other vassals are enfeoffed as marquises in China.
- The rapid conquest of the Hexi Corridor provides the traditional western provinces of China with greater security. As a result, Emperor Wu halves the number of soldiers garrisoning the provinces of Longxi, Beidi and Shang.

== Births ==
- Publius Sulpicius Rufus, Roman statesman (d. 88 BC)
- Quintus Sertorius, Roman general (d. 72 BC)

== Deaths ==
- Cleopatra Thea, Seleucid queen
- Gaius Gracchus, Roman politician (b. 154 BC)
- Marcus Fulvius Flaccus, Roman consul
