= Kırkağaç =

District in Manisa Province, Turkey

- District and municipality
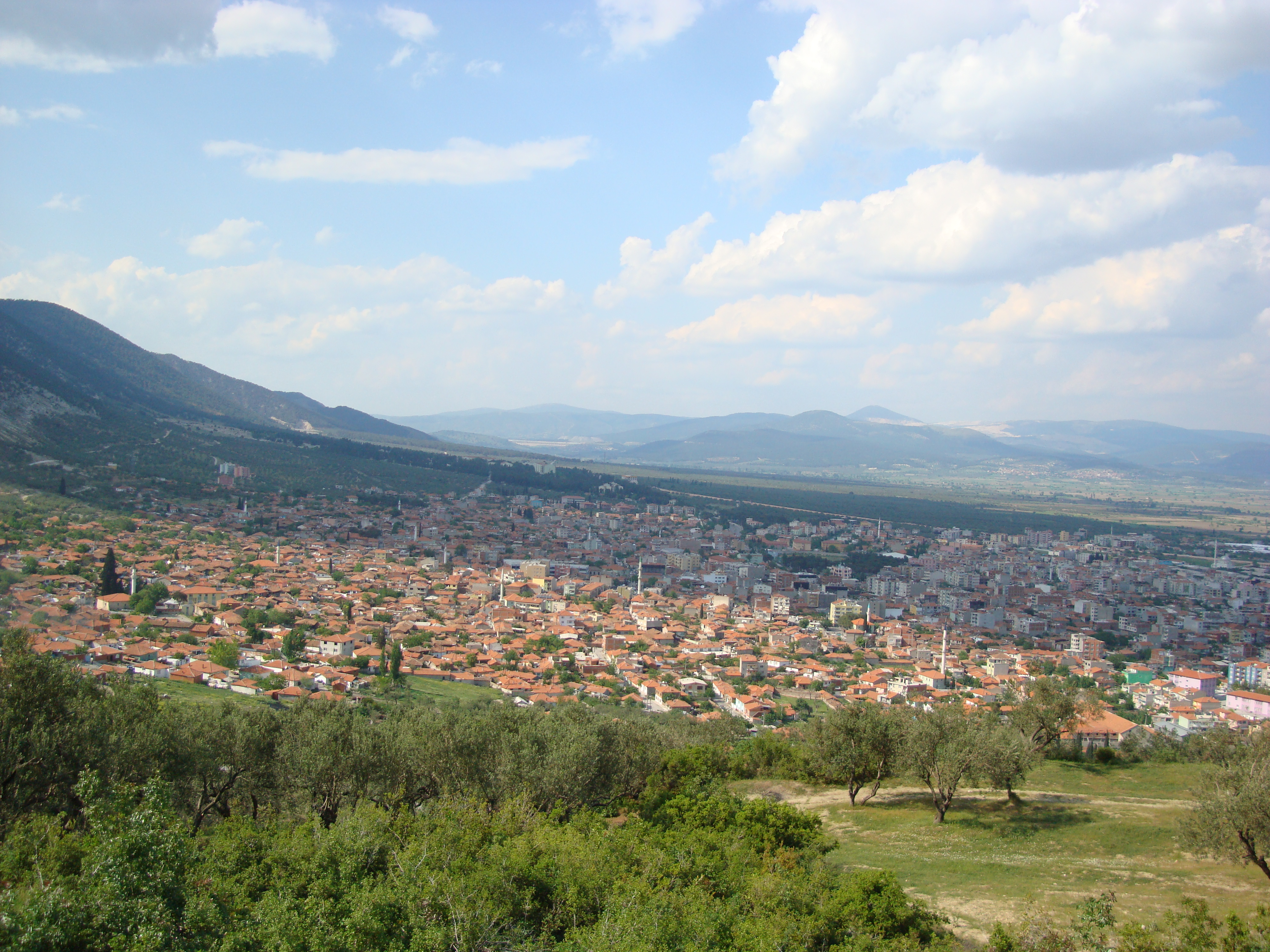

- Logo

- Map showing Kırkağaç District in Manisa Province

- Location within Turkey Location within Turkey Aegean
- Coordinates: 39°06′20″N 27°40′24″E
- Country: Turkey
- Province: Manisa
- Area: 541 km^{2} (209 sq mi)
- Elevation: 188 m (617 ft)
- Population (2022): 37,645
  - Density: 69.6/km^{2} (180/sq mi)
- Time zone: UTC+3 (TRT)
- Postal code: 45700
- Area code: 0236
- Website: www.kirkagac.bel.tr

Kırkağaç (Turkish: [ˈkɯɾkaːtʃ]) is a municipality and district of Manisa Province, Turkey. Its area is 541 km^{2}, and its population is 37,645 (2022). The town lies at an elevation of 188 m (617 ft).

== Features ==
Kırkağaç is an agricultural district and known for its variety of melon known as Kırkağaç melon (Turkish: Kırkağaç kavunu).

Olive, walnut, tobacco and almond cultivation is among the important agricultural activities of Kırkağaç.

There has been a road reconstruction in late 2021. A gas supply came to the city at the same time as to the city of Soma. A clock tower is situated in the center of the city.

== History ==
From 1867 until 1922, Kırkağaç was part of the Aidin Vilayet of the Ottoman Empire. The Greek writer Elias Venezis, in his book Number 31328, states that Kırkağaç was burned from the Armenian quarter by the "enemy" who left; although this book is a memoir, in later versions, the word "enemy" was changed to "Greek".

== Composition ==
There are 47 neighbourhoods in Kırkağaç District:

- Alacalar
- Alifakı
- Bademli
- Bakır
- Boduroğlu
- Bostancı
- Çaltıcak
- Çiftlikköy
- Cinosman
- Çobanlar
- Demirtaş
- Dualar
- Fırdanlar
- Gebeler
- Gelembe
- Gökçukur
- Güvendik
- Hacet
- Hacıhimmet
- Halkaavlu
- Hamidiye
- Hamitli
- Hıdırağa
- İlyaslar
- Işıklar
- Kadriye
- Karaali
- Karakurt
- Kayadibi
- Kınık
- Kocaiskan
- Kocamehmetağa
- Küçükyaya
- Kuyucak
- Memiş
- Musahoca
- Musalar
- Öveçli
- Şaireşref
- Sakarlı
- Sarıağa
- Siledik
- Söğütalanı
- Tevfikiye
- Yağmurlu
- Yenimahalle
- Zorağa
