= Ariarathes IV of Cappadocia =

3rd and 2nd-century BC king of Cappadocia

Ariarathes IV, surnamed Eusebes, "the Pious", (Ancient Greek: Ἀριαράθης Εὐσεβής, Ariaráthēs Eusebḗs), was the king of Cappadocia in 220–163 BC.

== Early life ==
Ariarathes IV was the son of the king of Cappadocia Ariarathes III and his Macedonian Greek wife Stratonice. He was a child at his accession, and reigned for about 57 years. He married his cousin Antiochis, the daughter of Antiochus III the Great, king of Syria, and Laodice III, and, in consequence of this alliance, assisted Antiochus in his war against the Romans. After the defeat of Antiochus by the Romans in 190 BC, Ariarathes sued for peace in 188, which he obtained on favourable terms, as his daughter, Stratonice, was about that time betrothed to Eumenes II, king of Pergamum, whom she later married, and became an ally of the Romans. In 183–179 , he assisted Eumenes in his war against Pharnaces, king of Pontus. Polybius mentions that a Roman embassy was sent to Ariarathes after the death of the Seleucid Antiochus IV Epiphanes, who died 164.

Antiochis, the wife of Ariarathes, is said to have at first borne him no children, and accordingly substituted two surrogates, who were called Ariarathes and Orophernes. Subsequently, however, it was said that she actually bore her husband two daughters and a son, who was named Mithridates, and afterwards became Ariarathes V, and then she informed Ariarathes of the deceit she had practiced upon him. The two surrogates were in consequence sent away from Cappadocia, one to Rome, the other to Ionia.

== Notes ==
Regnal titles
Preceded by Ariarathes III	King of Cappadocia; 220 BC – 163 BC	Succeeded by Ariarathes V
