= Stratonice of Cappadocia =

Princess of the Seleucid Empire

Stratonice (Greek: Στρατονίκη; fl. 3rd century BC) was a princess of the Seleucid Empire. She was one of the daughters born to the Seleucid Monarchs Antiochus II Theos and Laodice I. Among her brothers was the Seleucid King Seleucus II Callinicus and prince Antiochus Hierax.

In c. 257 BC, Antiochus II Theos arranged for Stratonice to marry Ariarathes III. Between 255 BC-250 BC, Antiochus II Theos recognized the Seleucid client state of Cappadocia to become an independent kingdom. In 255 BC, Ariarathes III of Cappadocia started co-ruling with his father, Ariamnes II. Ariarathes III would later proclaim himself as the first king of Cappadocia.

Through her marriage to Ariarathes III, Stratonice became the first Queen of Cappadocia. Stratonice and Ariarathes III, had a son called Ariarathes IV of Cappadocia who later succeeded his father as King of Cappadocia. Ariarathes IV later married his maternal second cousin Antiochis.
