= Ariarathes V of Cappadocia =

2nd-century BC king of Cappadocia

Ariarathes V "Father-Loving"
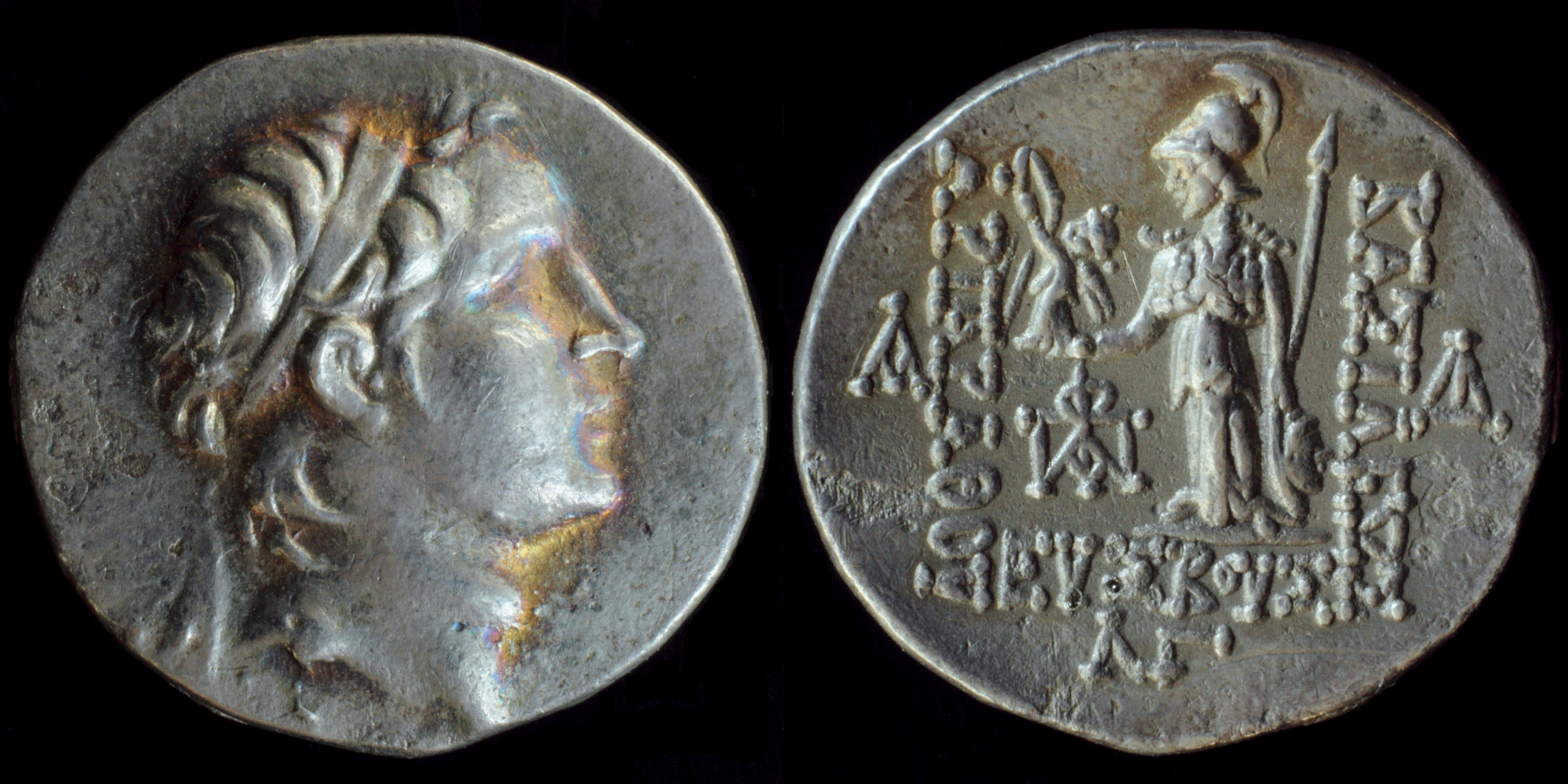
- coin of Ariarathes V

King of Cappadocia
- Reign: 163–130 BC
- Predecessor: Ariarathes IV
- Successor: Ariarathes VI
- Rival: Orophernes (159–157 BC)
- Born: Cappadocia
- Died: circ. 130 BC; Cappadocia
- Spouse: Nysa of Cappadocia
- Issue: Ariarathes VI; 5 other unnamed children
- Greek: Λευκών
- Father: Ariarathes IV
- Mother: Antiochis
- Religion: Greek Polytheism

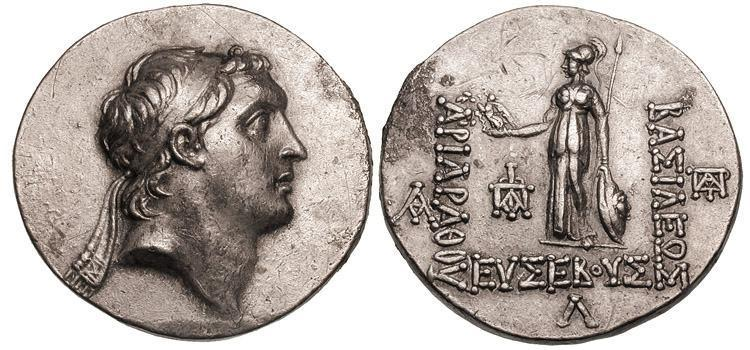

First side of the image: O: Diademed head of Ariarathes V
Second side of the image: R: Athena holding Nike with wreath and resting hand on grounded shield, spear behind; ΒΑΣΙΛΕΩΣ / ΑΡΙΑΡΑΘΟΥ / ΕΥΣΕΒΟΥΣ; monograms in field
Silver tetradrachm struck in Eusebia 133 BC; ref.: Simonetta 2 ; Λ in exergue is a greek numeral and means 30th year of reign

Ariarathes V Eusebes Philopator (Ancient Greek: Ἀριαράθης Εὐσεβής Φιλοπάτωρ; reigned 163–130 BC) was a son of the preceding king Ariarathes IV of Cappadocia and queen Antiochis. He was distinguished by his contemporaries for the excellence of his character and his cultivation of philosophy and the liberal arts and is considered by some historians to have been the greatest of the kings of Cappadocia.

== Early life ==
Ariarathes V was the son of the king Ariarathes IV of Cappadocia, and a noble Seleucid Greek woman, Antiochis, who was the daughter of the Seleucid King Antiochus III. According to Livy, he was educated in Rome; but this account may perhaps refer to another Ariarathes. Rather, Ariarathes Eusebes probably spent his youth studying in Athens, where he seems to have become a friend of the future king of Pergamon, Attalus II Philadelphus.

== Reign ==
In consequence of rejecting, at the wish of the Romans, a marriage with Laodice V, the sister of Demetrius I Soter, the latter made war upon Ariarathes, and brought forward Orophernes of Cappadocia, his brother and one of the supposed sons of the late king, as a claimant of the throne. Ariarathes was deprived of his kingdom, and fled to Rome in around 158 BC. He was restored to his throne by the Romans, who, however, allowed Orophernes to reign jointly with him, as is expressly stated by Appian, and implied by Polybius. The joint government, however, did not last long; for, shortly afterwards, Ariarathes was named as sole king.

In 154, Ariarathes assisted the king of Pergamon, Attalus II, in his war against Prusias II of Bithynia, and sent his son Demetrius in command of his forces. Ariarathes was killed in 130, during the war of the Romans against Aristonicus of Pergamon. In return for the assistance and support Ariarathes has provided to the Romans on that occasion, Lycaonia and Cilicia were added by the Romans to the dominions of his family.

== Marriage and succession ==
By Ariarathes' wife Nysa of Cappadocia (who was the daughter of King Pharnaces I of Pontus) he had six children. However, all but one of the children were killed by their mother, so that she might obtain the government of the kingdom. After she had been put to death by the people on account of her cruelty, her only surviving son succeeded to the crown as Ariarathes VI of Cappadocia.

== Legacy ==
Ariarathes was a strong philhellene; he was honoured with Athenian citizenship. He refounded the two Cappadocian towns of Mazaca and Tyana with the Greek name of Eusebia. He was generous in his donations to Athens and its institutions; an inscription remains by an association of professional actors which thanks him and his wife for his patronage. He corresponded with the Greek philosopher Carneades, as Diogenes Laërtius attests.

== Notes ==
Regnal titles
| Preceded by Ariarathes IV | King of Cappadocia; 163 BC – 130 BC | Succeeded by Ariarathes VI |
