= Eumenes II =

King of Pergamon from 197 to 159 BC

Eumenes II Soter
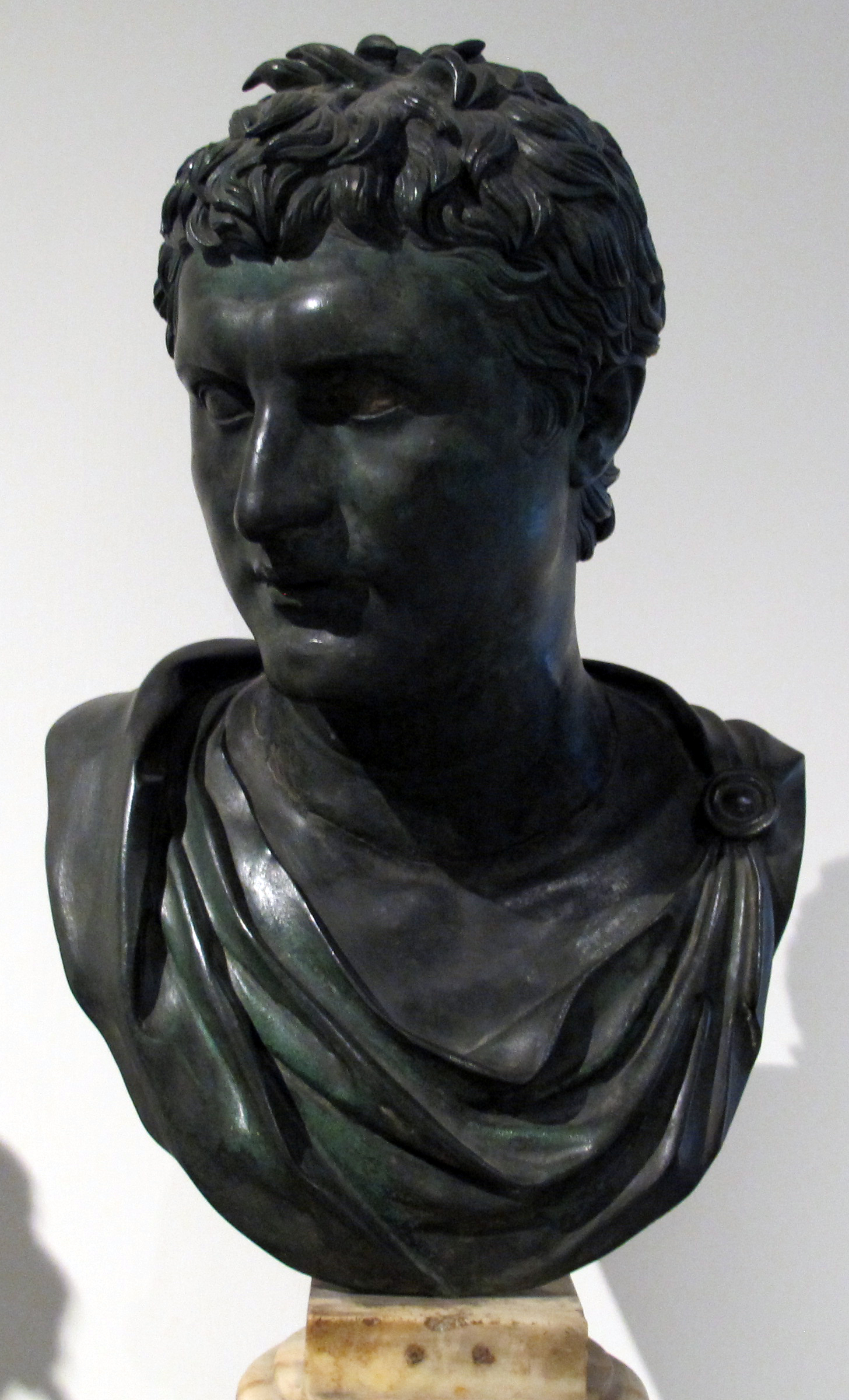
- Bust of Eumenes II (putative, also known more generically as the young commander)

King of Pergamon
- Reign: 197–159 BC
- Predecessor: Attalus I
- Successor: Attalus II
- Born: Before 220 BC
- Died: 159 BC; Pergamon
- Consort: Stratonice
- Issue: Attalus III; Eumenes III(?)
- Greek: Εὐμένης Σωτήρ
- House: Attalid dynasty
- Father: Attalus I
- Mother: Apollonis
- Religion: Greek Polytheism

Eumenes II Soter (/juːˈmɛniːz/; Ancient Greek: Εὐμένης Σωτήρ;) was king of the Hellenistic kingdom of Pergamon from 197 BC to 159 BC. He was a son of Attalus I Soter and queen Apollonis and a member of the Attalid dynasty of Pergamon.

== War against the Seleucids and expansion of the Attalid kingdom ==
The eldest of four sons to king Attalus I and queen Apollonis, Eumenes was presumably born prior to 220 BC. Eumenes followed in his father's footsteps upon becoming king and collaborated with the Romans to oppose Antigonid and especially Seleucid expansion in Asia Minor towards the Aegean. Eumenes, like his father, aided the Romans whenever he could. Following the end of the Second Macedonian War, he assisted Rome and the Achaean League against the Spartan tyrant Nabis in the Laconian war.

In the Roman-Seleucid War, he informed the Romans for Antiochus' ambitions by sending his brother, Attalus II, ahead and then sided with the Romans. He had refused to marry a daughter of Antiochus III upon noticing that he was about to engage in a war against the Romans. He then had married Stratonice of Pergamon, daughter of Ariarathes IV (King of Cappadocia) and his wife Antiochis, and their son was named Attalus III.

He played a crucial role in the defeat of Antiochus the Great at the Battle of Magnesia in 190 BC, where he commanded the right flank as well as in the naval battles against the Seleucids.

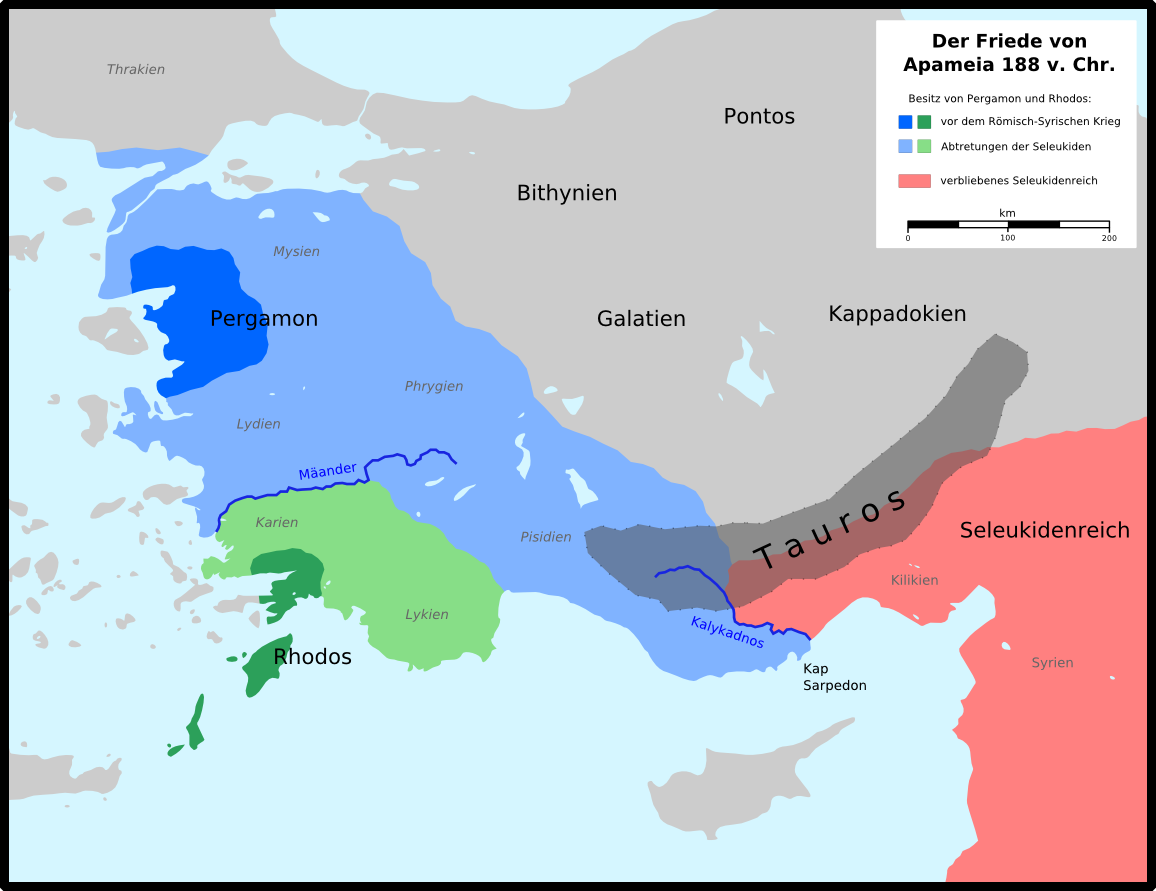
Map of Asia Minor after the Treaty of Apamea, with the gains of Pergamon (light blue) and Rhodes (light green)

Following the Peace of Apamea in 188 BC, he received the regions of Phrygia, Lydia, Pisidia, Pamphylia, and parts of Lycia and Thracian Chersonese from his Roman allies. Nonetheless, by dividing Asia Minor between their allies, Rhodes and Pergamon, the Romans made sure that neither state would be able to become too powerful in the region.

== Wars against Bithynia, Pontus and Macedon ==
He was then at war with the Bithynian king Prusias I in 183 BC, and after initial defeat, he received Roman support which allowed a revenge assault, ultimately resulting in his victory.

He also warred with Pharnaces I, who attempted to enlist the aid of the Seleucids, under Seleucus IV but due to the peace of Apamea, denied siding with him. Later on, in around 179 BC, after suffering losses, Pharnaces sued for peace.

Eumenes took also part in the Third Macedonian War where he aided the Romans in defeating the Antigonid Macedonian army led by Perseus of Macedon in the Battle of Pydna.

== Final years ==
Eumenes later fell out of favour with the Romans after they suspected him of conspiring with Perseus of Macedon. In order to avert suspicion, he sent his congratulations to Rome by his brother Attalus II after the defeat of Perseus. Attalus was received courteously, and in 167 BC the Romans made an abortive attempt to install Attalus on the Pergamene throne. Eumenes in alarm set out to visit Rome in person to plead his case, but on his arrival at Brundusium (Brindisi) was ordered to leave Italy at once. In the event, the ties of kinship proved strong, and Eumenes remained as ruler.

When Eumenes' health began to weaken, his brother Attalus II ascended to the throne as a co-ruler in 160 BC. Since Eumenes' and Stratonice's son was still a minor, the throne was assumed by Attalus, who also married Stratonice in 158 BC upon becoming king.

== Legacy ==
Eumenes II was a shrewd ruler and politician, who raised his state to a powerful monarchy. During his reign Pergamum became a flourishing city, where men of learning were always welcome, among them Crates of Mallus, the founder of the Pergamene school of criticism. Eumenes adorned the city with splendid buildings, amongst them the great altar with the frieze representing the Battle of the Giants. His great achievement was the expansion of the Library at Pergamon, one of the great libraries of the Ancient World and the place traditionally associated with the creation of parchment, although it had existed for centuries. He also built a stoa on the Athenian acropolis.

== Notes ==
Regnal titles
Preceded by Attalus I	King of Pergamon; 197–159 BC	Succeeded by Attalus II
