= Alexander (grandson of Seleucus I Nicator) =

3rd-century BC Seleucid nobleman and official

Alexander (Greek: Ἀλέξανδρος; flourished 3rd century BC) was a Greek nobleman of Anatolia and served as a Seleucid official.

Alexander was the first son born to Achaeus by an unnamed Greek mother. His father Achaeus was a wealthy nobleman who owned estates in Anatolia. His family had power in Anatolia with strong royal connections. Alexander had three siblings, two sisters, Antiochis and Laodice I, and a brother Andromachus. His father Achaeus was the second son of King Seleucus I Nicator and his first wife Apama I.

According to surviving inscriptions, Alexander was already active and held high positions under his paternal uncle Antiochus I Soter. A surviving decree at Bargylia honoring a judge from Teos mentions Alexander as having been ‘left in charge’ by Antiochus I Soter, meaning that Alexander was some sort of governor in the Caria region. The surviving decree at Bargylia dates from 270–261 BC.

During the reign of his paternal cousin and brother-in-law Antiochus II Theos, Alexander was a very powerful figure in Anatolia. Between 261–244 BC in Magnesia ad Sipylum, he is noted in writing a letter about land allotments granted to soldiers and he was honored at Tralles.

In the year 240 BC Alexander was still loyal to his nephew Seleucus II Callinicus, as he was the governor of Lydia, based at Sardis. In the civil war between Seleucus II Callinicus and his brother Antiochus Hierax, Alexander supported this second nephew, and held Sardis against attacks by Seleucus II.

After the end of the civil war, nothing is known on Alexander. His namesake was his great-nephew Seleucus III Ceraunus, whose name was Alexander until he succeeded his father Seleucus II Callinicus as King in 225 BC.

== Sources ==
- R. A. Billows, Kings and colonists: aspects of Macedonian imperialism, BRILL, 1995
- J. D. Grainger, A Seleukid prosopography and gazetteer, BRILL, 1997
- Seleucid genealogy
- Seleucus I Nicator article at Livius.org
