= Andromachus (son of Achaeus) =

3rd-century BC Seleucid nobleman

Andromachus (Ancient Greek: Ἀνδρόμαχος, lived 3rd century BC) was a Seleucid Greek nobleman. Andromachus was the son of Achaeus, a son of Seleucus I Nicator (the founder of the Seleucid Empire), and a wealthy nobleman who owned estates in Anatolia. His family was influential in Anatolia and had strong royal connections. Andromachus had three siblings; one brother: Alexander and three sisters: Antiochis, Laodice I and Laodice II. Andromachus was the father of Achaeus and his sister Laodice II was married to the Seleucid King Seleucus II Callinicus. As a result of this marriage, the future Seleucid kings, Seleucus III Ceraunus and Antiochus III the Great, were his nephews.

During the course of a war between the Seleucids and the Ptolemies, the Egyptian king Ptolemy III Euergetes took Andromachus prisoner; and when Ptolemy III died in 221 BC, Andromachus was still a prisoner in Egypt. Since Achaeus was anxious to secure his father's release, Ptolemy IV of Egypt’s chief advisor, Sosibius, regarded the captive nobleman as a very valuable piece to play in the political game. He had, perhaps, before the revolt of Achaeus, tried to strike a bargain with him—the release of Andromachus as the price for Achaeus deserting the Seleucid king. When Achaeus did revolt, pushed by other circumstances, and without having made any compact with Egypt, there was even less reason to let Andromachus go. Sosibius was very unwilling to part with such a valuable individual; but around 220 BC the Rhodians intervened on behalf of Achaeus, changing the situation radically.

The Rhodians' decision did not spring from altruism. It was a move with which they hoped to defeat the city-state of Byzantium, with which they were at war. Byzantium hoped to gain Achaeus' support against Rhodes and its allies. By obtaining Andromachus' release the Rhodians planned to foil the Byzantine plan and obtain Achaeus' support. They therefore sent an embassy to Ptolemy IV asking him to deliver Andromachus to them. While Ptolemy at first refused to free Andromachus, with further consideration, being anxious to please the Rhodians, the king yielded to their request and handed over Andromachus to them. This was done, and father and son were reunited. After these events, Andromachus disappears from history.
