= Achaeus =

Achaeus is a masculine given name. It may refer to:

== People ==
- Achaeus of Eretria (born 484 BC), tragic poet
- Achaeus of Syracuse (4th century BC), tragic poet
- Achaeus (son of Seleucus I Nicator) (3rd century BC), Greek Macedonian nobleman
- Achaeus (general) (died 213 BC), ruler of part of the Greek Seleucid kingdom

== Mythological figures ==
- Achaeus (mythology), three figures in Greek mythology

== See also ==
- Achaius, one of the legendary kings of Scotland
