= Seleucid agriculture =

Topic in Seleucid economic history

Seleucid agriculture was the main economic activity in the Seleucid Empire. Irrigation was more common inland in areas that received less rainfall than coastal regions of the Mediterranean. The Tigris, Euphrates and Oxus rivers allows water to be distributed through canal networks controlled by the Seleucids. Taxes were levied on agricultural goods based on the productive capacity of the land, and so irrigated lands like Mesopotamia were more heavily taxed.

The Selucids transitioned the economy from the commodity revenues of the Achaemenid era. The use of coin money became more common with urbanization as the Seleucids founded cities in previously undeveloped but cultivatable areas of northern Syria, north and east Mesopotamia, the Persian Gulf coast, Bactria and Media. Land grants were made to cities, and indigenous temples. The centers of agricultural production in Anatolia were non-urban villages and settlements belonging to indigenous temples, royal estates, tribes or cities. The best known of these is the estate of Laodice I, wife of King Antiochus II. Known from epigraphic sources, Laodice owned estates in Mysia and other regions of western Anatolia.

The staple cereal crops were wheat and barley; grapes and olives were found only in the coastal regions of the Aegean and Mediterranean seas. Animal husbandry was practiced, but was more significant for nomadic populations who lived in arid regions and in the Zagros.

Our knowledge of Seleucid agricultural estates is incomplete. Some terms are known to us from inscriptions but details about the organization of estates is limited mostly to the region of Western Anatolia - less is known about the river valleys of Syria, the plains region of Mesopotamia, and the lands of Cilicia and Iran. Many cities were founded, and lands were reserved for colonies, at first most military colonies of Macedonian or mixed origin, and later consisting of Seleucid inhabitants that were forcibly transferred, such as from Judea to western Anatolia. Forms of private property developed in cities while colonies were collective property.

There were agrarian properties (kome, baris, epaulis, chorion, topos, paradeisoi), private estates and temple possessions - sanctuaries served by hierodouloi from the annexed villages. These lands produced agricultural goods that varied from region to region, fruit, corn, grapes and vegetables.
