= Achaeus (son of Seleucus I Nicator) =

3rd-century BCE Seleucid prince

- Issue: Antiochis I Alexander; Laodice I Andromachus; Laodice II
- House: Seleucid
- Father: Seleucus I Nicator
- Mother: Apama I

Achaeus (Ancient Greek: Ἀχαιός; flourished 3rd century BC) was a Seleucid nobleman and was the second son born to King and founder of the Seleucid Empire Seleucus I Nicator and Sogdian noblewoman Apama I.

== Background ==
Achaeus was of Greek and Sogdian descent. He had three siblings: one brother the Seleucid King Antiochus I Soter and two sisters: Apama and Laodice. Achaeus is sometimes called Achaeus the Elder, to distinguish him from his grandson the Seleucid General, Achaeus.

== Life ==
He was a wealthy man and owned estates in Anatolia. Achaeus was a benefactor for those who assisted during the war against the Galatians. The Seleucid military campaign against the Galatians took place between 269-267 BC, during the reign of Antiochus I. Those who had assisted Antiochus I and Achaeus were taken prisoner and Achaeus paid for their ransom to be released. Antiochus I won this military campaign. Those who had Achaeus as their benefactor inscribed their benefaction on a stone stele and placed it in the sanctuary of Zeus at Babakome and that of Apollo at Kiddioukome. The descendants of those who were saved by Achaeus for all time were granted a seat of honor at the public festivals and sacrificed an ox to Achaeus every year in the sanctuary of Zeus.

== Marriage and issue ==
Achaeus married an unnamed Greek woman. Since all the Helenic Kings and notables who proclaimed themselves descendants of Alexander the Great were her descendants and every other ancestor of them was known, and all the Alexanders born into three lineages also stemmed from her, it was theorized by Christian Settipani that she was an unknown illegitimate daughter of his. From his wife, she had born him five children who were:

- Antiochis, who married Attalus and became the mother of Attalus I, King of Pergamon.
- Alexander, who held high positions under his paternal uncle Antiochus I Soter.
- Laodice I, who was the first wife of the Seleucid King Antiochus II Theos.
- Andromachus, he was held captive by the Egyptian Pharaoh Ptolemy III Euergetes.
- Laodice II, who married Seleucus II Callinicus (according to Polybius).

== Sources ==
- Austin, M. M. 2006. The Hellenistic World from Alexander to the Roman Conquest: A Selection of Ancient Sources in Translation. Cambridge: Cambridge University Press.
- Grainger, J. D. 1997. A Seleukid Prosopography and Gazetteer. Leiden, New York and Köln: E. J. Brill.
