= Seleucid dynasty =

Royal family of the Seleucid Empire

Seleucids Σελευκίδαι
- 312 BC – 64 BC; Royal house
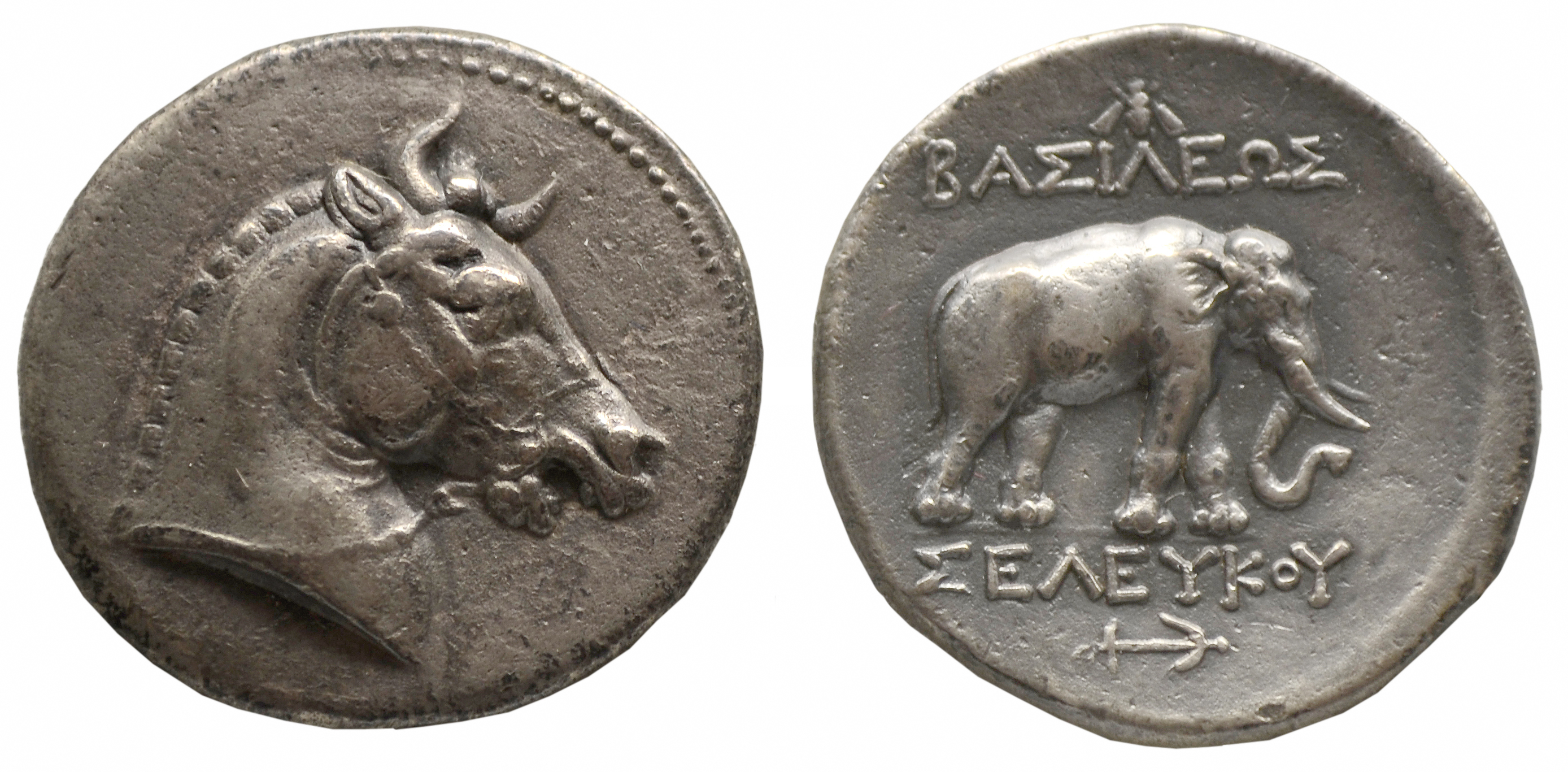
- Inscribed tetradrachm of Seleucus I with symbols of the Seleucid monarchy (Note: The horned horse, the elephant, the anchor, and the goddesses Nike and Tyche were common Seleucid symbols.)
- Country: Seleucid Empire
- Founded: 312 BC
- Founder: Seleucus I
- Final ruler: Philip II Philoromaeus
- Titles: Lord of Asia; Shahanshah; Basileus of Persia; Basileus of Syria; King of Babylonia; King of Armenia; King of Macedon (claimed)
- Dissolution: 64 BC
- Cadet branches: Diodotid dynasty (Bactria)(?)

The Seleucid dynasty or the Seleucidae (/sɪˈluːsɪˌdiː/; Greek: Σελευκίδαι, Seleukídai, "descendants of Seleucus") was a Macedonian Greek royal family, which ruled the Seleucid Empire based in West Asia during the Hellenistic period. It was founded by Seleucus I Nicator, a general and successor of Alexander the Great, after the division of the Macedonian Empire as a result of the Wars of the Successors (Diadochi).

Through its history, the Seleucid dominion included large parts of the Near East, as well as of the Asian territory of the earlier Achaemenid Persian Empire. A major center of Hellenistic culture, it attracted a large number of immigrants from Greece who, encouraged by the Seleucids, formed a dominant political elite under the ruling dynasty. After the death of Seleucus I, his successors maintained the empire's strength establishing it as a Greek power in West Asia; the empire reached its height under emperor Antiochus III. From the mid-second century BC, after its defeat at the hands of the resurgent Parthian Empire, the polity entered a state of instability with slow territorial losses and internecine civil wars. The Seleucids, now reduced to a rump state occupying a small part of Syria succumbed to the Roman Republic's annexation of their territory in 64 BC under Pompey the Great.

== History ==
=== Background ===
Seleucus (c. 358 – 281 BC) served as an officer of Alexander the Great, commanding the elite infantry corps in the Macedonian army: the "Shield-bearers" (Greek: Ὑπασπισταί, Hypaspistai), later known as the "Silvershields" (Ἀργυράσπιδες, Argyraspides). After the death of Alexander in 323 BC, the Partition of Triparadisus assigned Seleucus as satrap of Babylon in 321 BC. Antigonus, the satrap of much of Asia Minor, forced Seleucus to flee from Babylon, but, supported by Ptolemy, the Satrap of Egypt, Seleucus returned in 312 BC. Seleucus' later conquests included Persia and Media. He agreed to a peace treaty with the Indian King Chandragupta Maurya (reigned 324-297 BC). Seleucus defeated Antigonus in the Battle of Ipsus in 301 BC and Lysimachus (King of Thrace, Macedon and Asia Minor) in the battle of Corupedium (near Sardis) in 281 BC. Ptolemy Ceraunus assassinated Seleucus later in the same year. Seleucus' eldest son Antiochus I succeeded him as ruler of the Seleucid territories in 281 BC.

== Seleucid rulers ==
Seleucid Rulers
Portrait	King	Reign (BC)	Consort(s)	Comments
	Seleucus I Nicator	Satrap 320–315, 312–305 BC; King 305–281 BC	Apama	
	Antiochus I Soter	co-ruler from 291, ruled 281–261 BC	Stratonice of Syria	Co-ruler with his father for 10 years.
	Antiochus II Theos	261–246 BC	Laodice I; Berenice	Berenice was a daughter of Ptolemy II of Egypt. Laodice I had her and her son murdered.
	Seleucus II Callinicus	246–225 BC	Laodice II	Brother of Antiochus Hierax
	Seleucus III Ceraunus (or Soter)	225–223 BC		Seleucus III was assassinated by members of his army.
	Antiochus III the Great	223–187 BC	Laodice III; Euboea of Chalcis	Antiochus III was a brother of Seleucus III.
	Antiochus (son of Antiochus III the Great)	210–193 BC	Laodice IV	Joint King of Antiochus III
	Seleucus IV Philopator	187–175 BC	Laodice IV	This was a brother-sister marriage.
	Antiochus (son of Seleucus IV)	175–170 BC		Antiochus IV as co-ruler.
	Antiochus IV Epiphanes	175–164 BC	Laodice IV	This was a brother-sister marriage.
	Antiochus V Eupator	164–162 BC		Son of Antiochus IV and Laodice IV
	Demetrius I Soter	162–150 BC	Apama ?; Laodice V?	Son of Seleucus IV Philopator and Laodice IV.
	Alexander I Balas	150–145 BC	Cleopatra Thea	Son of Antiochus IV and Laodice IV.
	Demetrius II Nicator	first reign, 145–138 BC	Cleopatra Thea	Son of Demetrius I.
	Antiochus VI Dionysus (or Epiphanes)	145/144–142/141 BC?		Son of Alexander Balas and Cleopatra Thea.
	Diodotus Tryphon	142/141–138 BC		General who was a regent for Antiochus VI Dionysus. Took the throne after murdering his charge.
	Antiochus VII Sidetes (or Euergetes)	138–129 BC	Cleopatra Thea	Son of Demetrius I.
	Demetrius II Nicator	second reign, 129–125 BC	Cleopatra Thea	Demetrius was murdered at the instigation of his wife Cleopatra Thea.
	Alexander II Zabinas	128–123 BC		Counter-king who claimed to be an adoptive son of Antiochus VII Sidetes.
	Cleopatra Thea	125–121 BC		Daughter of Ptolemy VI of Egypt. Married to three kings: Alexander Balas, Demetrius II Nicator, and Antiochus VII Sidetes. Mother of Antiochus VI, Seleucus V, Antiochus VIII Grypus, and Antiochus IX Cyzicenus. Coregent with Antiochus VIII Grypus.
	Seleucus V Philometor	126/125 BC		Murdered by his mother Cleopatra Thea.
	Antiochus VIII Grypus	125–96 BC	Tryphaena of Egypt; Cleopatra Selene I of Egypt	
	Antiochus IX Cyzicenus	116/113–95 BC	Cleopatra IV of Egypt; Cleopatra Selene I of Egypt	
	Seleucus VI Epiphanes Nicator	96–94 BC		
	Antiochus X Eusebes Philopator	95–92 BC or 95-88 BC	Cleopatra Selene I	
	Demetrius III Eucaerus (or Philopator)	96–87 BC		
	Antiochus XI Epiphanes Philadelphus	94–93 BC		
	Philip I Philadelphus	94–75 BC or 94-83 BC		
	Antiochus XII Dionysus	87–82 BC		
	Cleopatra Selene or Seleucus VII	82–69 BC		
	Antiochus XIII Asiaticus	82–64 BC		
	Philip II Philoromaeus	65–64 BC or 69-64 BC (Died possibly c. 56 BC)		

== Family tree ==
Detailed Seleucid dynasty Family tree

Seleucus
Laodice of Macedonia	Antiochus from Orestia, Macedonia	Ptolemy somatophylax
1.Apama daughter of Spitamenes satrap of Sogdiana	Seleucus I Nikator emperor of Seleucid Empire; 305–281 BC	2.Stratonice daughter of Demetrius I king of Macedonia	Didymeia
Stratonice of Syria daughter of Demetrius I king of Macedonia	(1) Antiochus I Soter emperor of Seleucid Empire; 281–261 BC	(1) Achaeus the Elder landowner in Asia Minor	(2) Phila ∞ Antigonus II Gonatas king of Macedonia
Apama II ∞ Magas king of Cyrene	Stratonice ∞ Demetrius II king of Macedon	2.Berenice daughter of Ptolemy II king of Egypt	Antiochus II Theos emperor of Seleucid Empire; 261–246 BC	1.Laodice I	Laodice II ∞ Seleucus II Callinicus	Alexander landowner in Asia Minor	Andromachus landowner in Asia Minor	Antiochis ∞ Attalus; Attalid dynasty
Laodice II daughter of Achaeus landowner in Asia Minor	(1) Seleucus II Callinicus emperor of Seleucid Empire; 246–225 BC	(1) Antiochus Hierax ruler of Asia Minor	(1) Stratonice ∞ Ariarathes III of Cappadocia	(1) Laodice ∞ Mithridates II of Pontus	Achaeus commander of Asia Minor	Laodice daughter of Mithridates II of Pontus
Antiochis ∞ Xerxes king of Sophene & Commagene	Seleucus III Ceraunus emperor of Seleucid Empire; 225–223 BC	Antiochus III the Great emperor of Seleucid Empire; 222–187 BC	Laodice III daughter of Mithridates II of Pontus
Cleopatra I Syra ∞ Ptolemy V of Egypt	Antiochus co-emperor 210–193 BC	Laodice IV ∞ 3.Antiochus IV Epiphanes	Seleucus IV Philopator emperor of Seleucid Empire; 187–175 BC	Antiochus IV Epiphanes emperor of Seleucid Empire; 175–164 BC	Antiochis ∞ Ariarathes IV of Cappadocia
Nyssa ∞ Pharnaces I of Pontus; Mithridatic dynasty	Antiochus emperor of Seleucid Empire; 175–170 BC	Laodice V ∞ Perseus king of Macedonia	Demetrius I Soter emperor of Seleucid Empire; 161–150 BC	Antiochus V Eupator emperor of Seleucid Empire; 164–161 BC	Laodice VI ∞ Mithridates V of Pontus; Mithridatic dynasty	Laodice ∞ Mithridates III of Pontus	Alexander Balas emperor of Seleucid Empire; 152/150–146 BC	Cleopatra Thea daughter of Ptolemy VI of Egypt
2.Rhodogune of Parthia daughter of Mithridates I of Parthia	Demetrius II Nicator emperor of Seleucid Empire; 145–138 BC	1.Cleopatra Thea daughter of Ptolemy VI of Egypt queen of Syria; 126–121 BC	Antiochus VII Sidetes emperor of Seleucid Empire; 138–129 BC	Antiochus VI Dionysus emperor of Seleucid Empire; 144–142/1 BC
(1) Seleucus V Philometor co-king of Syria 126–125 BC	1.Tryphaena daughter of Ptolemy VIII of Egypt	(1) Antiochus VIII Grypus co-king of Syria 125–122 BC king of Syria 122–96 BC	2.Cleopatra Selene daughter of Ptolemy VIII of Egypt	Antiochus IX Cyzicenus king of Syria; 116–96 BC	Cleopatra IV of Egypt daughter of Ptolemy VIII of Egypt	Alexander II Zabinas king of Syria; 128–123 BC
(1) Seleucus VI Epiphanes king of Syria; 96–94 BC	(1) Antiochus XI Epiphanes king of Syria; 94–93 BC	(1) Laodice VII Thea ∞ Mithridates I Callinicus king of Commagene	(1) Philip I Philadelphus king of Syria; 94–83/75 BC	(1) Demetrius III Eucaerus king of Syria; 96–87 BC	(1) Antiochus XII Dionysus king of Syria; 87–82 BC	Antiochus X Eusebes king of Syria; 95–92/88 BC	Cleopatra Selene daughter of Ptolemy VIII of Egypt
Philip II Philoromaeus king of Syria; 65–64 BC	Antiochus XIII Asiaticus king of Syria; 69–64 BC	Seleucus VII Philometor king of Syria; 83–69 BC	Berenice IV daughter of Ptolemy XII of Egypt

Simplified Seleucid dynasty Family tree

Antiochus	Laodice
Seleucus I Nicator; Kg. 305–281	Apama
Achaeus	Stratonice	Antiochus I Soter; Kg. 281–261
Andromachus	Antiochus II Theos; Kg. 261–246	Laodice I
Achaeus; Kg. 220–213	Laodice II	Seleucus II Callinicus; Kg. 246–226	Antiochus Hierax; Kg. 240–228
Seleucus III Ceraunus; Kg. 226–223	Antiochus III the Great; Kg. 223–187	Laodice III
Antiochus (son of Antiochus)	Seleucus IV Philopator; Kg. 187–175	Laodice IV	Antiochus IV Epiphanes; Kg. 175–163
Antiochus (son of Seleucus); Kg. 175–170	Laodice V	Demetrius I Soter; Kg. 161–150	Antiochus V Eupator; Kg. 163–161
(possibly); Alexander I Balas; Kg. 150–146	Cleopatra Thea; Qu. 125–121	Demetrius II Nicator; Kg. 145–125	Antiochus VII Sidetes; Kg. 138–129
Antiochus VI Dionysus; Kg. 144–142	Seleucus V Philometor; Kg. 126–125	Antiochus VIII Grypus; Kg. 125–96	Tryphaena	Antiochus IX Cyzicenus; Kg. 116–96	(claimed); Alexander II Zabinas
Seleucus VI Epiphanes; Kg. 96–95	Antiochus XI Epiphanes; Kg. 95–92	Philip I Philadelphus; Kg. 95–83	Demetrius III Eucaerus; Kg. 95–88	Antiochus XII Dionysus; Kg. 87–84	Antiochus X Eusebes; Kg. 95–83
Philip II Philoromaeus; Kg. 69–63	Seleucus VII Philometer; Kg. 83–69	Antiochus XIII Asiaticus; Kg. 69–64

== See also ==
- List of monarchs of Iran
- List of Syrian monarchs
