= Syrian Wars =

Conflict between the Seleucid Empire and the Ptolemaic Kingdom

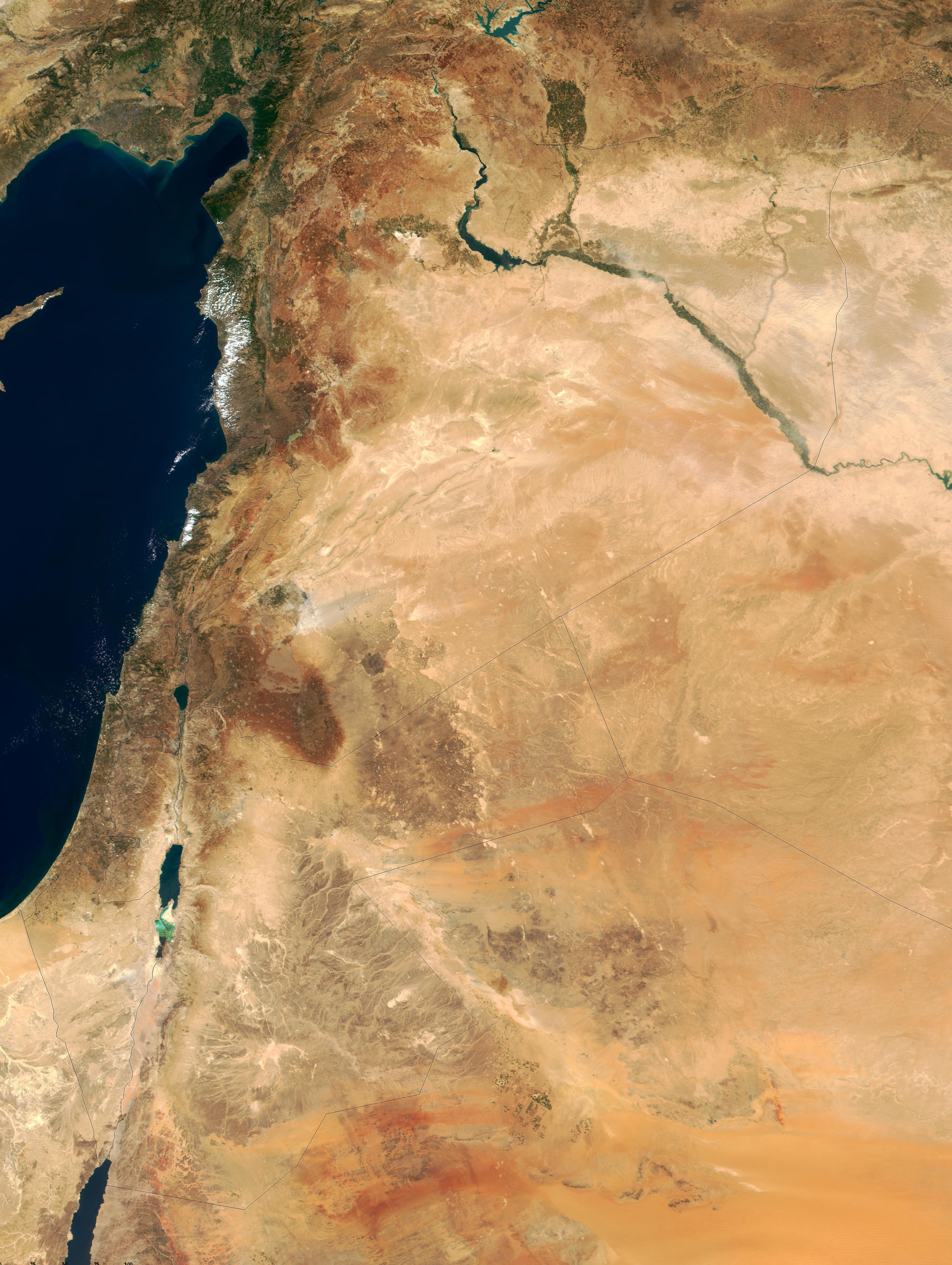
- Coele-Syria, the site where much of the wars took place
Date	274–271 BC; 260–253 BC; 246–241 BC; 219–217 BC; 202–195 BC; 170–168 BC
Location	Coele-Syria
Result	Inconclusive; Antigonus Gonatas annexes the Cyclades; Antiochus the Great annexes Ptolemaic holdings in Coele-Syria, Asia Minor and other Ptolemaic holdings outside of Egypt, Cyrenaica and Cyprus; Second Macedonian War during the Fifth Syrian War; Roman intervention in 168 BC during the Sixth Syrian War prevents Antiochus IV from annexing the Ptolemaic kingdom

Belligerents
Ptolemaic Kingdom; Rome (200-168 BC)	Seleucid Empire; Macedon (c. 260-197 BC)

Commanders and leaders
Ptolemy II Philadelphus; Ptolemy III Euergetes; Ptolemy IV Philopator; Ptolemy V Epiphanes; Ptolemy VI Philometor; Ptolemy VIII Physcon; Cleopatra II	Antiochus I Soter; Antiochus II Theos; Antigonus II Gonatas; Seleucus II Callinicus; Antiochus III the Great; Philip V of Macedon; Antiochus IV Epiphanes

The Syrian Wars were a series of six wars between the Seleucid Empire and the Ptolemaic Kingdom of Egypt, successor states to Alexander the Great's empire, during the 3rd and 2nd centuries BC over the region of Coele-Syria (modern-day south-western Syria and Beqaa Valley). Control of this corridor mattered because it linked Asia to Egypt, threatened the Nile Delta, lay within the natural geographic continuation of Seleucid Syria, and generated substantial agricultural and mercantile revenue. These conflicts drained the resources and manpower of both parties and led to their eventual destruction and conquest by Rome and Parthia. They are briefly mentioned in the biblical Books of the Maccabees.

== Background ==
In the Wars of the Diadochi following Alexander's death, Coele-Syria initially came under the rule of Antigonus I Monophthalmus. In 301 BC Ptolemy I Soter, who four years earlier had crowned himself King of Egypt, exploited events surrounding the Battle of Ipsus to take control of the region. The victors at Ipsus, however, had allocated Coele-Syria to Ptolemy's former ally Seleucus I Nicator, founder of the Seleucid Empire. Seleucus, who had been aided by Ptolemy during his ascent to power, did not take any military action to reclaim the region. Once both were dead, however, their successors became embroiled in war.

== First Syrian War (274–271 BC) ==
A decade into his rule, Ptolemy II faced Antiochus I, the Seleucid king who was trying to expand his empire's holdings in Syria and Anatolia. Ptolemy proved to be a forceful ruler and skilled general. In addition, his recent marriage to his court-wise sister Arsinoe II of Egypt had stabilized the volatile Egyptian court, allowing Ptolemy to successfully carry out the campaign.

The First Syrian War was a major victory for the Ptolemies. Antiochus took the Ptolemaic controlled areas in coastal Syria and southern Anatolia in his initial rush. Ptolemy reconquered these territories by 271 BC, extending Ptolemaic rule as far as Caria and into most of Cilicia. With Ptolemy's eye focused eastward, his half-brother Magas declared his province of Cyrenaica to be independent. It would remain independent until 250 BC, when it was reabsorbed into the Ptolemaic Kingdom: but not before having triggered a sequence of Ptolemaic and Seleucid court intrigues, war and ultimately leading to the marriage of Theos and Berenice.

== Second Syrian War (260–253 BC) ==
Antiochus II succeeded his father in 261 BC, and thus began a new war for Syria. He reached an agreement with the current Antigonid king in Macedon, Antigonus II Gonatas, who was also interested in pushing Ptolemy II out of the Aegean. With Macedon's support, Antiochus II launched an attack on Ptolemaic outposts in Asia.

Most of the information about the Second Syrian War has been lost. It is clear that Antigonus' fleet defeated Ptolemy's at the Battle of Cos in 261 BC, diminishing Ptolemaic naval power. Ptolemy appears to have lost ground in Cilicia, Pamphylia, and Ionia, while Antiochus regained Miletus and Ephesus. Macedon's involvement in the war ceased when Antigonus became preoccupied by the rebellion of Corinth and Chalcis in 253 BC, possibly instigated by Ptolemy, as well as an increase in enemy activity along Macedon's northern frontier.

The war was concluded around 253 BC with the marriage of Antiochus to Ptolemy's daughter, Berenice Syra. Antiochus repudiated his previous wife, Laodice, and turned over substantial domain to her. He died in Ephesus in 246 BC, poisoned by Laodice according to some sources. Ptolemy II died in the same year.

== Third Syrian War (246–241 BC) ==
Also known as the Laodicean War, the Third Syrian War began with one of the many succession crises that plagued the Hellenistic states. Antiochus II left two ambitious mothers, his repudiated wife Laodice and Ptolemy II's daughter Berenice Syra, in a competition to put their respective sons on the throne. Laodice claimed that Antiochus had named her son heir while on his deathbed, but Berenice argued that her newly born son was the legitimate heir. Berenice asked her brother Ptolemy III, the new Ptolemaic king, to come to Antioch and help place her son on the throne. When Ptolemy arrived, Berenice and her child had been assassinated.

Ptolemy declared war on Laodice's newly crowned son, Seleucus II, in 246 BC, and campaigned with great success (his forces possibly being commanded by Xanthippus of Lacedaemon, aka Xanthippus of Carthage, the mercenary general responsible for defeating a Roman army at Tunis/Bagrades in 255 BC). He won major victories over Seleucus in Syria and Anatolia, briefly occupied Antioch and, as a recent cuneiform discovery proves, even reached Babylon. These victories were marred by the loss of the Cyclades to Antigonus Gonatas in the Battle of Andros. Seleucus had his own difficulties. His domineering mother asked him to grant co-regency to his younger brother, Antiochus Hierax, as well as rule over Seleucid territories in Anatolia. Antiochus promptly declared independence, undermining Seleucus' efforts to defend against Ptolemy.

In exchange for peace in 241 BC, Ptolemy was awarded new territories on the northern coast of Syria, including Seleucia Pieria, the port of Antioch. The Ptolemaic kingdom was at the height of its power.

== Fourth Syrian War (219–217 BC) ==
Upon taking the Seleucid throne in 223 BC, Antiochus III the Great (241–187 BC) set himself the task of restoring the lost imperial possessions of Seleucus I Nicator, which extended from the Greco-Bactrian Kingdom in the east, the Hellespont in the north, and Syria in the south. By 221 BC, he had re-established Seleucid control over Media and Persia, which had been in rebellion. The ambitious king turned his eyes toward Syria and Egypt.

Egypt had been significantly weakened by court intrigue and public unrest. The rule of the newly inaugurated Ptolemy IV Philopator (reigned 221–204 BC) began with the murder of queen-mother Berenice II. The young king quickly fell under the absolute influence of imperial courtiers. His ministers used their absolute power in their own self-interest, to the people's great chagrin.

Antiochus sought to take advantage of this chaotic situation. After an invasion in 221 BC failed to launch, he finally began the Fourth Syrian War in 219 BC. He recaptured Seleucia Pieria as well as cities in Phoenicia, amongst them Tyre. Rather than promptly invading Egypt, Antiochus waited in Phoenicia for over a year, consolidating his new territories and listening to diplomatic proposals from the Ptolemaic kingdom.

Meanwhile, Ptolemy's minister Sosibius began recruiting and training an army. He recruited not only from the local Greek population, as Hellenistic armies generally were, but also from the native Egyptians, enrolling at least thirty thousand natives as phalangites. This innovation paid off, but it would eventually have dire consequences for Ptolemaic stability. In the summer of 217 BC, Ptolemy engaged and defeated the long-delayed Antiochus in the Battle of Raphia, the largest battle since the Battle of Ipsus over eighty years earlier.

Ptolemy's victory preserved his control over Coele-Syria, and the weak king declined to advance further into Antiochus' empire, even to retake Seleucia Pieria. The Ptolemaic kingdom would continue to weaken over the following years, suffering from economic problems and rebellion. Patriotic sentiment had developed among the native Egyptians who had fought at Raphia. Confident, well-trained, but resentful of the Ptolemaic Dynasty, they broke from Ptolemy in what is known as the Egyptian Revolt, establishing their own kingdom in Upper Egypt which the Ptolemies finally reconquered around 185 BC.

== Fifth Syrian War (202–195 BC) ==
The death of Ptolemy IV in 204 BC was followed by a bloody conflict over the regency as his heir, Ptolemy V, was just a child. The conflict began with the murder of the dead king's wife and sister Arsinoë by the ministers Agothocles and Sosibius. The fate of Sosibius is unclear, but Agothocles seems to have held the regency for some time until he was lynched by the volatile Alexandrian mob. The regency was passed from one adviser to another, and the kingdom was in a state of near anarchy.

Seeking to take advantage of this turmoil, Antiochus III staged a second invasion of Coele-Syria. He convinced Philip V of Macedon to join the war and conquer the Ptolemies' territories in Asia Minor – actions which led to the Second Macedonian War between Macedon and the Romans. Antiochus quickly swept through the region. After a brief setback at Gaza, he delivered a crushing blow to the Ptolemies at the Battle of Panium near the head of the River Jordan which earned him the important port of Sidon.

In 200 BC, Roman emissaries came to Philip and Antiochus demanding that they refrain from invading Egypt. The Romans would suffer no disruption of the import of grain from Egypt, key to supporting the massive population in Italy. As neither monarch had planned to invade Egypt itself, they willingly complied to Rome's demands. Antiochus completed the subjugation of Coele-Syria in 198 BC and went on to raid Ptolemy's remaining coastal strongholds in Caria and Cilicia.

Problems at home led Ptolemy to seek a quick and disadvantageous conclusion. The nativist movement, which began before the war with the Egyptian Revolt and expanded with the support of Egyptian priests, created turmoil and sedition throughout the kingdom. Economic troubles led the Ptolemaic government to increase taxation, which in turn fed the nationalist fire. In order to focus on the home front, Ptolemy signed a conciliatory treaty with Antiochus in 195 BC, leaving the Seleucid king in possession of Coele-Syria and agreeing to marry Antiochus' daughter Cleopatra I.

== Sixth Syrian War (170–168 BC) ==
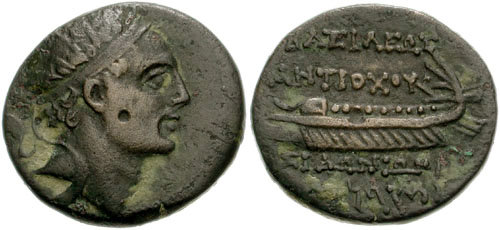
Sidon coinage of Antiochus IV, depicting a victorious galley.

=== Background (195–170 BC) ===
The Seleucids had little desire to become entangled in a new war with the Ptolemies. After their defeat in the Roman–Seleucid War, they were required by the Treaty of Apamea in 188 BC to pay a large indemnity to the Roman Republic. They already controlled Coele-Syria and were also occupied with affairs on their eastern frontier.

Internal dissent and rebellions weakened the Ptolemaic kingdom over time. The power of the monarchy waned, while the influence of powerful aristocrats in Alexandria increased, as did that of Egyptian nativist movements. Ptolemy V appears to have been preparing to raise funds for an attempt to reclaim Coele-Syria, but he died unexpectedly in 180 BC. In the atmosphere of suspicion surrounding his death, it was suggested that he had been poisoned, perhaps by courtiers who wished to prevent a war or avoid the taxes and levies needed to finance it. His widow, Cleopatra I, favored maintaining peace, perhaps because she considered war imprudent or because of her descent from the Seleucid royal house. Cleopatra I died in 176 BC, but her eldest son, Ptolemy VI Philometor, was still only about 10 years old, necessitating a continued regency. Eulaeus and Lenaeus became regents of the young king, apparently as a compromise between competing factions at the Egyptian court. Under the regents, Ptolemy VI was married to his sister Cleopatra II, who was made co-ruler.

=== Sixth War ===
The causes of the new conflict are obscure. Relations between the two powers deteriorated, with both sending emissaries to Rome, which was then occupied by the Third Macedonian War, seeking military support against the other even before the war began. In 170 BC, Ptolemy VI's younger brother Ptolemy VIII Physcon was added as a co-ruler, apparently to strengthen the unity of the Ptolemaic kingdom. The three rulers were all minors. Although the precise circumstances remain unclear, the Ptolemaic regents Eulaeus and Lenaeus appear to have initiated the war against the Seleucid ruler Antiochus IV Epiphanes. This may have reflected a desire to rally Egypt around a common cause, political advantages for the pro-war faction, and an underestimation of the difficulty of the campaign. Antiochus IV had learned of the Egyptian preparations and was in Tyre in July and August 170 BC preparing his forces. He reached the strategically important town of Pelusium in November 170 BC. As the Ptolemaic army moved out of Pelusium to begin its invasion of Coele-Syria, the Seleucids defeated it in the Sinai desert, perhaps taking advantage of the Egyptians' surprise at their immediate readiness to fight. Ptolemaic losses mounted during the retreat to Pelusium, which soon fell with little loss of life after the army surrendered. Pelusium was the gateway to the rest of Egypt; with it under Seleucid control, their supply lines were secure and Egypt was placed in grave danger. Antiochus took Naucratis and camped near Alexandria, potentially threatening a siege.

The Egyptians suffered internal unrest over the poor progress of the war. Eulaeus and Lenaeus were overthrown and replaced by two new regents, Comanus and Cineas. Egyptian envoys were sent to negotiate a peace treaty. Antiochus took Ptolemy VI, who was his nephew, under his guardianship, perhaps intending to make Egypt a client state subordinate to Seleucid power. Archaeological evidence indicates that even Thebes in southern Egypt was occupied by a foreign army in October 169 BC, apparently Seleucid. However, the occupation was unacceptable to the people of Alexandria, who responded by proclaiming Ptolemy VIII as sole king. Antiochus besieged Alexandria but was unable to cut communications with the city and, in late 169 BC, withdrew his army, leaving Ptolemy VI as a rival king in Memphis. Antiochus may have withdrawn to deal with problems in Phoenicia and elsewhere in his kingdom.

In Antiochus's absence, Ptolemy VI and his brother Ptolemy VIII were reconciled, possibly after a brief civil struggle. After the collapse of his control over Egypt, Antiochus invaded again in 168 BC. The Egyptians appealed to Rome for assistance, and the Senate dispatched Gaius Popillius Laenas to Alexandria. Meanwhile, a Seleucid fleet seized Ptolemaic Cyprus, while Antiochus's army took Memphis again. At Memphis, he even issued an official decree in his capacity as Egyptian king. The Ptolemaic armies did not offer any major field battle, instead remaining in fortified garrisons. Antiochus was therefore prepared to march on Alexandria again. At Eleusis, on the outskirts of Alexandria, he met Popillius Laenas, whom he had known during his stay in Rome. Instead of a friendly welcome, Popillius presented the king with an ultimatum from the Roman Senate: he was to evacuate Egypt and Cyprus immediately. Rome had only recently defeated the Macedonians at the Battle of Pydna, potentially freeing forces with which it could credibly threaten the Seleucids. According to Polybius, when Antiochus asked for time to consider the ultimatum, Popillius drew a circle around him in the sand with his cane and told him to decide before stepping outside it. Antiochus chose to obey the Roman ultimatum to avoid a new Roman–Seleucid War. Polybius described the retreat as personally humiliating for Antiochus. The confrontation, sometimes known as the "Day of Eleusis", effectively ended the Sixth Syrian War and forced Antiochus to abandon his attempt to conquer Egypt. The Ptolemies, however, had also been greatly weakened by the war and by the conflict between Ptolemy VI and Ptolemy VIII. A rebel named Dionysus Petosarapis subsequently attempted to exploit the hostility between the two brothers, beginning a series of revolts from 168 to 164 BC.

== Ptolemy VI's intervention in the Seleucid Dynastic Wars ==
While not usually classed as the "Seventh Syrian War", the Ptolemies and a portion of the Seleucids would clash again in 145 BC. The Seleucid Empire began to fall to internal disorder in 152 BC as the Romans and Pergamese, seeking to destabilize and weaken Syria, encouraged Alexander Balas to make a hostile claim on the throne against King Demetrius I Soter. Alexander's allies funded him and hired mercenaries on his behalf, and he was able to gain the loyalty of those of Syria who disliked Demetrius, such as Jewish military leader Jonathan Apphus. Alexander eventually won the civil war, a diplomatic coup for Ptolemy VI who saw a competent, ambitious, and hostile Seleucid rival in Demetrius replaced by an opportunist in Balas. Ptolemy VI's daughter Cleopatra Thea married Alexander Balas as a gesture of friendship.

However, this peace did not last. Demetrius II, Demetrius I's son, made a play to overthrow Balas, who gained a reputation as a weak ruler (whether deserved or not). The civil war resumed, and Egyptian forces massed on the border around 147 BC, ready to intervene in the Seleucid civil war. With Alexander's permission, they occupied much of coastal Coele-Syria, with the cooperation of Alexander's Jewish allies who expanded and took over more of the Judean hills and interior. As Ptolemy VI marched north, he switched sides and demanded his son-in-law hand over his chief minister on likely faked charges. Presumably Demetrius II had offered to legitimize Ptolemaic rule of Coele-Syria if he switched to aiding his faction. Ptolemy VI now marched on Antioch; Alexander abandoned the city, apparently disliking his chances in a siege. Ptolemy VI now ruled from Syria itself, with Demetrius II as a puppet; Cleopatra Thea was remarried to the new king. Alexander Balas's loyalists harassed the countryside outside of Antioch. Eventually, Ptolemy VI rallied his forces and the Ptolemaic-Demetrius II coalition went to meet him at a nearby river. The Battle of the Oenoparus resulted. Alexander's army was defeated, and he was forced to flee to his Nabatean (Arab) allies, where he was murdered by two of his own men. Ptolemy VI died of wounds. The unexpected winner was thus Demetrius II who, with the Ptolemaic king dead and the Seleucids briefly unified, turned on his former Egyptian allies and was able to banish the Ptolemaic occupation force out of Coele-Syria.

== See also ==
- Hellenistic period
