= Achaeus (general) =

3rd-century BC Seleucid general, short-lived ruler of Seleucid Asia-Minor

- Basileus
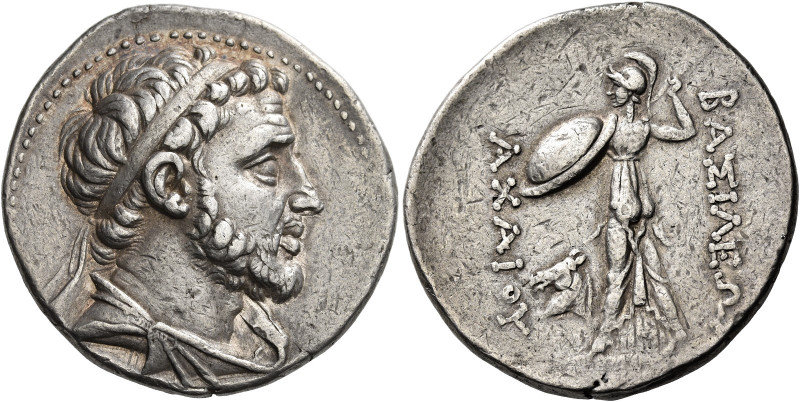
- Tetradrachm of Achaeus, minted around 220-214 BC that shows Nike.

Usurper King of the Seleucid Empire
- Reign: 220–214 BC
- Predecessor: Seleucus III
- Successor: Antiochos III
- Born: Ἀχαιός/Achaiós
- Died: 214 BC; Sardes
- Dynasty: Seleucid
- Father: Andromachus
- Mother: Laodice of Pontus
- Military career
- Conflicts: Siege of Sardis (214 BC)

Achaeus (Ancient Greek: Ἀχαιός, Achaiós; died 214 BC) was a general and later a separatist ruler of part of the Greek Seleucid kingdom. He was the son of Andromachus, whose sister Laodice II married Seleucus II Callinicus, the father of Antiochus III the Great. He accompanied Seleucus III Ceraunus, the son of Callinicus, in his expedition across mount Taurus against Attalus I, and after the assassination of Seleucus III Ceraunus revenged his death; and though he might easily have assumed the royal power right then, he remained faithful to Antiochus III, brother of Seleucus III, for the time being, that is until he proclaimed himself king in 220 BC.

During a military engagement between Ptolemy III and Seleucus II, the precise circumstances of which are still unknown, his father Andromachus fell captive to Ptolemy III. Andromachus was eventually suggested to be a bargaining chip which would force Achaeus to join forces with Ptolemy against Seleucus, though at this stage Achaeus' loyalty was still unwavering.

In 223 BC, Antiochus III, the successor of Seleucus III Ceraunus, appointed Achaeus to the command of all Asia Minor on the western side of Mount Taurus. Achaeus recovered all the districts which Attalus I had gained on the Seleucids once more, thereby destroying the aspirations of Attalus to become a major power, driving him back to the territory of Pergamum in 222 BC, and taking the whole of Asia on the western side of the Taurus. The fourth Syrian War and the preoccupation of Antiochus and his army with Ptolemy IV and Molon provided Achaeus the opportunity to declare himself king in Phrygia in the autumn of 220, thus finally severing the ties with Antiochus III. In 218 BC, Attalus regained control over the Greek cities of northern Ionia, Aeolis and Troas and the Mysian lands as far east as the Megistos river, which occupied Achaeus during the fourth Syrian war. Upon the conclusion of a treaty with Ptolemy IV of Egypt, Antiochus crossed the Taurus in 216 BC, united his forces with Attalus, and in one campaign deprived Achaeus of his dominions and took Sardis (with the exception of the citadel). After sustaining a siege of two years, the citadel at last fell into the hands of Antiochus in 214 BC, through the treachery of Bolis (who had been employed by Sosibius, minister to Ptolemy). Bolis pledged to deliver Achaeus to safety, but turned him over to Antiochus, who immediately put him to death.

== Bibliography ==
- Bement, R. B.; The kingdom of Brass (1856)
- Polybius; Histories, Evelyn S. Shuckburgh (translator); London - New York, (1889)
- Smith, William (editor); Dictionary of Greek and Roman Biography and Mythology, "Achaeus (2)", Boston, (1867)
- Walbank, F.W.; Astin, A.E.; Frederiksen, M. W.; Ogilvie, R. M. (1984). Cambridge Ancient History: The Hellenistic World (2nd ed.). Cambridge: Cambridge University Press
