= Antiochus III the Great =

King of the Seleucid Empire from 222 to 187 BC

Antiochus III
- Basileus
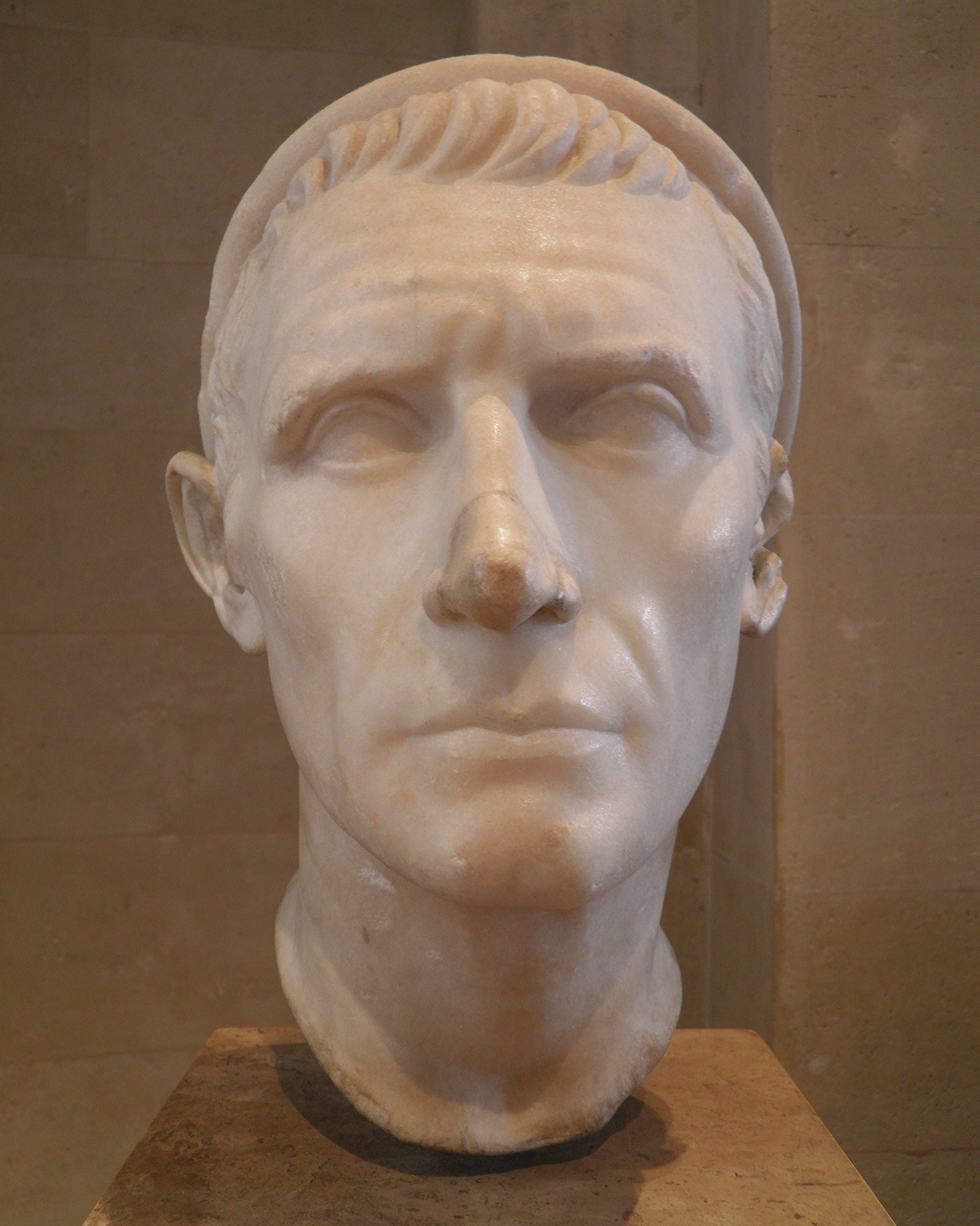
- Bust from the Louvre, often labelled as the Roman copy of a Hellenistic portrait of Antiochus III

Basileus Megas of the Seleucid Empire
- Reign: April/June 223 – 3 July 187 BC (36 years)
- Predecessor: Seleucus III Ceraunus
- Successor: Seleucus IV Philopator
- Co-king: Antiochus (210–193 BC)
- Rival kings: Molon (222-220 BC); Achaeus (220–214 BC)
- Born: c. 241 BC; Susa, Seleucid Empire
- Died: 3 July 187 BC (aged 54); Susa, Seleucid Empire
- Spouse: Laodice III; Euboea of Chalcis
- Issue: Antiochus; Seleucus IV Philopator; Ardys; Laodice of Bactria; Laodice IV, Queen of the Seleucid Empire; Cleopatra I Syra, Queen of Egypt; Antiochis, Queen of Cappadocia; Antiochus IV
Names
- Antiochos ho Mégas; Ἀντίoχoς ὁ Μέγας ("Antiochus the Great")
- Dynasty: Seleucid
- Father: Seleucus II Callinicus
- Mother: Laodice II
- Religion: Greek polytheism

Antiochus III the Great (/ænˈtaɪəkəs/; Ancient Greek: Ἀντίοχος ὁ Μέγας, Antíokhos ho Mégas; c. 241 BC – 3 July 187 BC) was the sixth ruler of the Seleucid Empire, reigning from 223 BC to 187 BC.

Ascending to the throne at the age of eighteen, Antiochus inherited an empire in turmoil after the death of his brother, Seleucus III Ceraunus. While his initial campaigns against Ptolemaic Egypt ended in failure, he spent the decade that followed successfully reasserting Seleucid authority over territory such as central Asia Minor, Parthia and Bactria. Pressing as far as the Kabul valley, he renewed a friendship with the Indian king Sophagasenus and earned himself the epithet "the Great" (Antiochos Megas). He also assumed the title Basileus Megas (Greek for 'Great King'), the traditional title of the Persian kings. Upon his return to the west, Antiochus launched another campaign against the Ptolemies and brought Coele-Syria, Phoenicia and Judea under Seleucid control.

Antiochus's designs on the Greek city-states earned him the antagonism of the Roman Republic. Declaring himself the "champion of Greek freedom against Roman domination", he waged a four-year war against Rome beginning in mainland Greece in the autumn of 192 BC, advised by the exiled Carthaginian general Hannibal and supported by an alliance with the Aetolian League. He was resoundingly defeated at the battles of Thermopylae (191 BC) and Magnesia (190 BC), resulting in the loss of much of the Seleucid lands in Asia Minor to Rome's allies. Renewed rebellions ensued, and Antiochus died three years later on another expedition to the east.

== Biography ==
=== Background and early reign ===
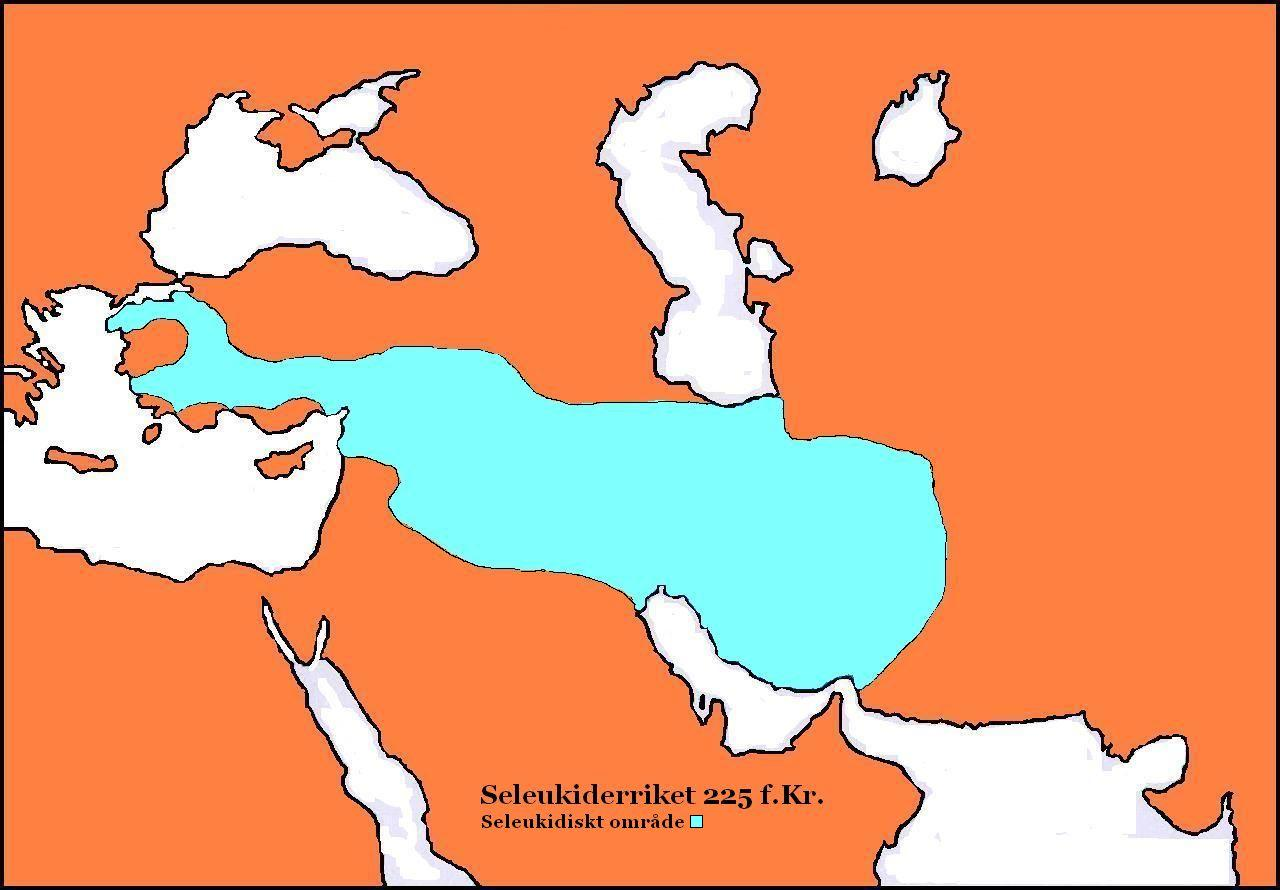
Seleucid Kingdom at the time of Antiochus's accession to the throne.

Antiochus III was a member of the Hellenistic Seleucid dynasty. He was the son of king Seleucus II Callinicus and Laodice II, aunt of Seleucus, and was born around 242 BC near Susa in Persia. He may have initially borne a non-dynastic name (starting with Ly-), according to a Babylonian chronicle. He succeeded, under the name Antiochus, his brother Seleucus III Ceraunus, upon the latter's murder in Anatolia; he was in Babylon at the time.

Antiochus III inherited a disorganized state. Not only had Asia Minor become detached, but the easternmost provinces had broken away, Bactria under the Seleucid Diodotus of Bactria, and Parthia under the rebel satrap Andragoras in 247–245 BC, who was himself later vanquished by the nomad chieftain Arsaces. In 222 BC, soon after Antiochus's accession, Media and Persis revolted under their governors, the brothers Molon and Alexander. The young king, under the influence of the minister Hermeias, headed an attack on Ptolemaic Syria instead of going in person to face the rebels. The attack against the Ptolemaic empire proved a fiasco, and the generals sent against Molon and Alexander met with disaster. Only in Asia Minor, where the king's cousin, Achaeus, represented the Seleucid cause, did its prestige recover, driving the Pergamene power back to its earlier limits.

In 221 BC Antiochus at last went far east, and the rebellion of Molon and Alexander collapsed which Polybius attributes in part to his following the advice of Zeuxis rather than Hermeias. The submission of Lesser Media, which had asserted its independence under Artabazanes, followed. Antiochus conspired with his physician and allies to have Hermeias assassinated, and then returned to Syria (220 BC). Meanwhile, Achaeus himself had revolted and assumed the title of king in Asia Minor. Though, due to the brewing mutiny of his troops arising from their dissatisfaction over his rebellion against their king, Achaeus desisted from his attempted coup and retreated. While sending additional threats to Achaeus, Antiochus left him for the time being and renewed his attempts on Ptolemaic Syria.

=== Early wars against other Hellenistic rulers ===
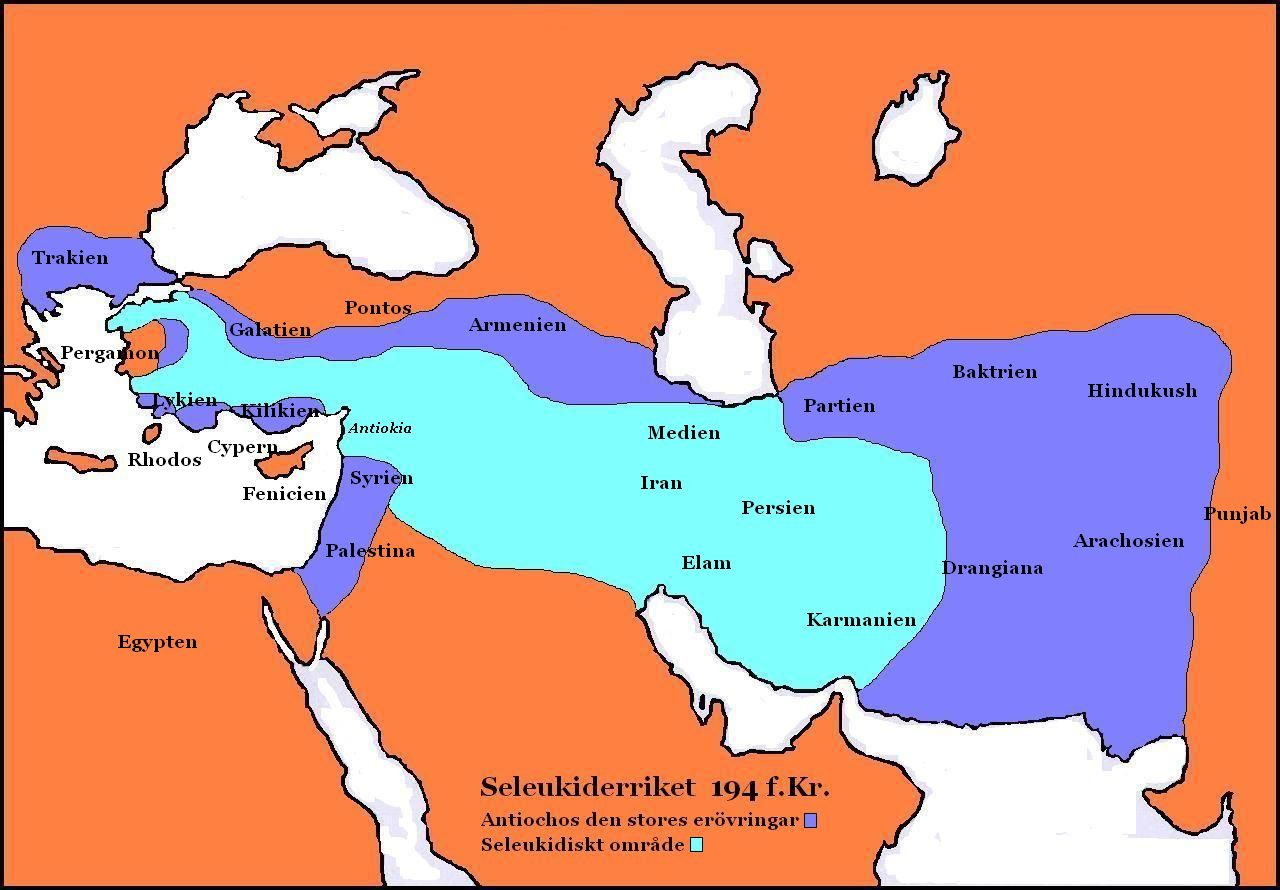
Seleucid Empire after the wars of expansion

The campaigns of 219 BC and 218 BC carried the Seleucid armies almost to the confines of the Ptolemaic Kingdom, but in 217 BC Ptolemy IV defeated Antiochus at the Battle of Raphia. This defeat nullified all Antiochus's successes and compelled him to withdraw north of Lebanon. In 216 BC his army marched into western Anatolia to suppress the local rebellion led by Antiochus's own cousin Achaeus, and had by 214 BC driven him from the field into Sardis. Capturing Achaeus, Antiochus had him executed. The citadel managed to hold out until 213 BC under Achaeus's widow Laodice who surrendered later.

Having thus recovered the central part of Asia Minor (for the Seleucid government had perforce to tolerate the dynasties in Pergamon, Bithynia and Cappadocia), Antiochus turned to recovering the outlying provinces of the north and east. He besieged Xerxes of Sophene in 212 BC, who had refused to pay tribute. During the siege of Arsamosata, some of Antiochus's advisors proposed deposing Xerxes and installing Mithridates, a nephew of Antiochus, in his place. Antiochus declined this counsel. He summoned Xerxes, waived the bulk of the tribute arrears his father, Arsames I, had accumulated, and accepted a reduced immediate settlement in silver, horses, and mules. He allowed Xerxes to continue ruling Sophene and gave him his sister Antiochis in marriage. In 209 BC Antiochus invaded Parthia, occupied the capital Hecatompylos and pushed forward into Hyrcania, winning the Battle of Mount Labus. The Parthian king Arsaces II apparently successfully sued for peace.

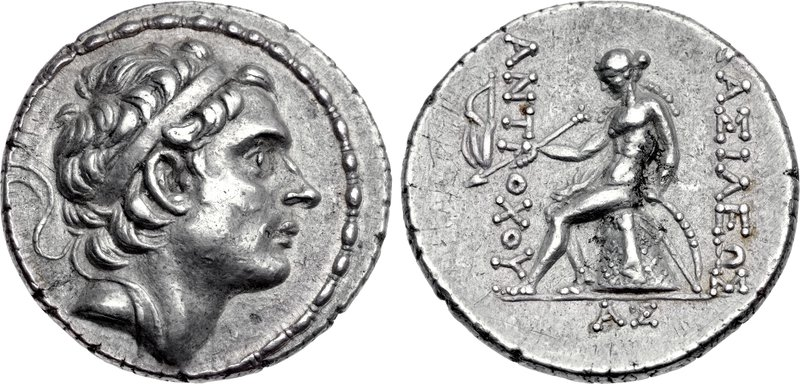
Silver coin of Antiochus III. Reverse shows Apollo seated on omphalos, holding bow and arrows, with Greek legend: ΒΑΣΙΛΕΩΣ ΑΝΤΙΟΧΟΥ, "of King Antiochus".

=== Bactrian campaign and Indian expedition ===
The year 209 BC saw Antiochus in Bactria, where the Greco-Bactrian king Euthydemus I had supplanted the original rebel. Antiochus again met with success. Euthydemus was defeated by Antiochus at the Battle of the Arius, but after resisting the Seleucid king in the Siege of Bactra, he obtained an honourable peace by which Antiochus promised Euthydemus's son Demetrius the hand of Laodice, his daughter, and allowed Euthydemus himself to keep his royal title.

Antiochus next, following in the steps of Alexander, crossed into the Kabul valley, reaching the realm of Indian king Sophagasenus and returned west by way of Seistan and Kerman (206/5). According to Polybius:

He crossed the Caucasus and descended into India, renewed his friendship with Sophagasenus, king of the Indians, and received more elephants, raising their number to a total of one hundred and fifty, and provisioned his army once more on the spot. He himself broke camp with his troops, leaving behind Androsthenes of Cyzicus to bring back the treasure which this king (Sophagasenus) had agreed to give him.

=== Persia and Coele Syria campaigns ===
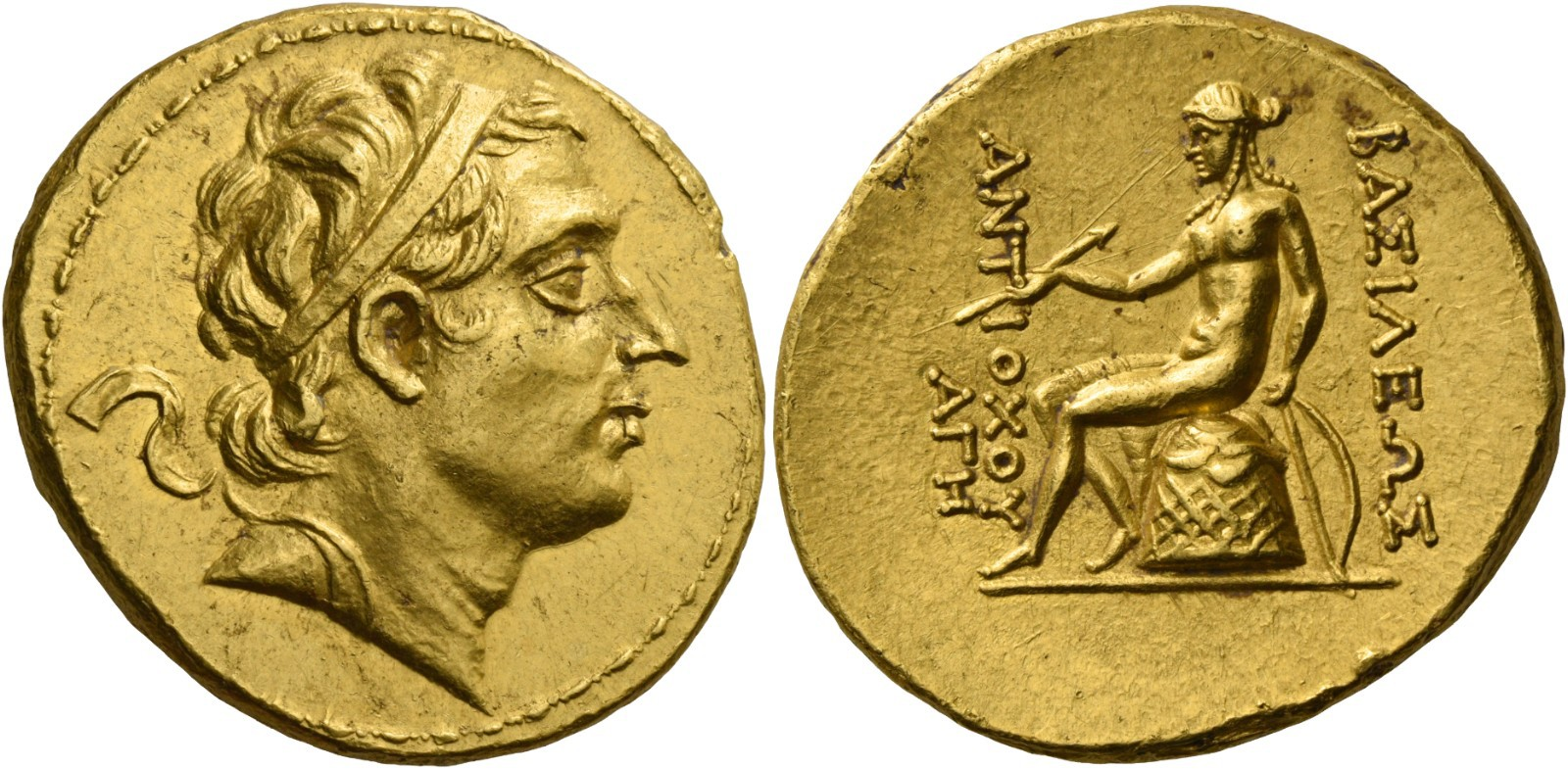
Gold octodrachm of Antiochus III; Antioch mint 204-197 BC. Obverse shows king wearing diadem. Reverse shows Apollo seated on omphalos holding bow and arrows, with Greek legend: ΒΑΣΙΛΕΩΣ ΑΝΤΙΟΧΟΥ, Basileōs Antiokhou, "of King Antiochus".

From Seleucia on the Tigris he led a short expedition down the Persian Gulf against the Gerrhaeans of the Arabian coast (205 BC/204 BC). Antiochus seemed to have restored the Seleucid empire in the east, which earned him the title of "the Great" (Antiochos Megas). In 205/204 BC the infant Ptolemy V Epiphanes succeeded to the Egyptian throne, and Antiochus is said (notably by Polybius) to have concluded a secret pact with Philip V of Macedon for the partition of the Ptolemaic possessions. Under the terms of this pact, Macedon was to receive the Ptolemaic possessions around the Aegean Sea and Cyrene, while Antiochus would annex Cyprus and Egypt.

Once more Antiochus attacked the Ptolemaic province of Coele Syria and Phoenicia, and by 199 BC he seems to have had possession of it before the Aetolian leader Scopas recovered it for Ptolemy. But that recovery proved brief, for in 198 BC Antiochus defeated Scopas at the Battle of Panium, near the sources of the Jordan, a battle which marks the end of Ptolemaic rule in Judea.

=== War against Rome and death ===
Antiochus then moved to Asia Minor, by land and by sea, to secure the coast towns which belonged to the remnants of Ptolemaic overseas dominions and the independent Greek cities. This enterprise earned him the antagonism of the Roman Republic, since Smyrna and Lampsacus appealed to the Republic, which at the time acted as a defender of Greek freedom. The tension grew when Antiochus in 196 BC established a footing in Thrace. The evacuation of Greece by the Romans gave Antiochus his opportunity, and he now had the fugitive Hannibal at his court to urge him on.

In 192 BC Antiochus invaded Greece with a 10,000-man army, and was elected the commander in chief of the Aetolian League. In 191 BC, however, the Romans under Manius Acilius Glabrio routed him at Thermopylae, forcing him to withdraw to Asia Minor. The Romans followed up their success by invading Anatolia, and the decisive victory of Scipio Asiaticus at Magnesia ad Sipylum (190 BC), following the defeat of Hannibal at sea off Side, delivered Asia Minor into their hands.

By the Treaty of Apamea (188 BC) Antiochus abandoned all the country north and west of the Taurus Mountains, most of which the Roman Republic gave either to Rhodes or to the Attalid ruler Eumenes II, its allies (many Greek cities were left free). As a consequence of this blow to Seleucid power, the outlying provinces of the empire, recovered by Antiochus, reasserted their independence. Antiochus mounted a fresh eastern expedition in Luristan, where he was killed while pillaging a temple of Bel at Elymaïs, Persia, in 187 BC.

== Family ==
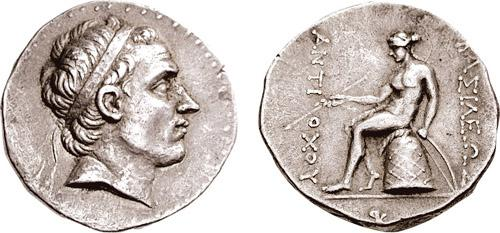
Coin of Antiochus III the Great, struck around Mesopotamia. The Greek inscription reads: ΒΑΣΙΛΕΩΣ ΑΝΤΙΟΧΟΥ, Basileōs Antiokhou, "of King Antiochus".

In 222 BC, Antiochus III married Princess Laodice of Pontus, a daughter of King Mithridates II of Pontus and Princess Laodice of the Seleucid Empire. The couple were first cousins through their mutual grandfather, Antiochus II Theos. Antiochus and Laodice had eight children (three sons and five daughters):

- Antiochus (221–193 BC), Antiochus III's first heir apparent and joint-king with his father from 210 to 193 BC
- Seleucus IV Philopator (c. 220 – 175 BC), Antiochus III's successor
- Ardys
- Daughter (name unknown), betrothed in about 206 BC to Demetrius I of Bactria
- Laodice IV, married all three of her brothers in succession and became Queen of the Seleucid Empire through her second and third marriages
- Cleopatra I Syra (c. 204 – 176 BC), married Ptolemy V Epiphanes of Egypt in 193 BC
- Antiochis, married King Ariarathes IV of Cappadocia in 194 BC
- Mithridates (215–164 BC), succeeded his brother Seleucus IV Philopator in 175 BC under the regnal name Antiochus IV Epiphanes

In 191 BC, Antiochus III married a girl from Chalcis, whom he named "Euboea". They had no children. Laodice III may have fallen in disgrace; however, she clearly survived Antiochus III, and appears in Susa in 183 BC.

== Antiochus and the Jews ==
Antiochus III resettled 2000 Jewish families from Babylonia into the Hellenistic Anatolian regions of Lydia and Phrygia. Josephus portrays him as friendly towards the Jews of Jerusalem and cognizant of their loyalty to him (see Antiquities of the Jews, Book XII, Chapter 3), in stark contrast to the attitude of his son. In fact, Antiochus III lowered taxes, granted subventions to the Temple, and let the Jews live, as Josephus puts it, "according to the law of their forefathers."

== Books of Maccabees ==
Antiochus III is mentioned in the deuterocanonical Books of the Maccabees. The subject of Maccabees is the Maccabean Revolt against Antiochus's son, Antiochus IV Epiphanes. Antiochus III is first mentioned in 1 Maccabees 1:10, when Antiochus IV is introduced as "son of King Antiochus [Antiochus III]". Antiochus III is mentioned later in 1 Maccabees 8, which describes Judas Maccabeus's knowledge of the deeds of the Roman Republic, including an allusion to the defeat of Antiochus III by the Romans. The NRSV says "They [the Romans] also had defeated Antiochus the Great, king of Asia, who went to fight against them with one hundred twenty elephants and with cavalry and chariots and a very large army. He was crushed by them; they took him alive and decreed that he and those who would reign after him should pay a heavy tribute and give hostages and surrender some of their best provinces, the countries of India, Media, and Lydia. These they took from him and gave to King Eumenes." (1 Maccabees 8:6–8)

== Cultural portrayals ==
- During the Caroline era, the play Believe as You List was centred around Antiochus's resistance to the Romans after the Battle of Thermopylae. The play was originally about Sebastian of Portugal surviving the Battle of Alcazar, returning and trying to gather support to return to the throne. This first version was censored for being considered "subversive" because it portrayed Sebastian being deposed, it had comments in favour of an Anglo-Spanish alliance and it was possibly pro-Catholic. That led to the final version changing to the story of Antiochus, which led to historical inaccuracy in exaggerating his defeat at that phase in history to fit the earlier text and turning Spaniards into Romans and the Catholic eremite into a Stoic philosopher.
- Antiochus features towards the end of Norman Barrow's historical novel, The High Priest (Faber & Faber, 1947), after his forces have reacquired Jerusalem from the Ptolemaic occupation. The book was noted by John Betjeman in the Daily Herald as "interesting".

== See also ==
- List of Syrian monarchs
- Timeline of Syrian history

== Notes ==
Antiochus III the Great Seleucid dynasty Born: c. 241 BC Died: 187 BC
Regnal titles
Preceded by Seleucus III Ceraunus	Seleucid King (King of Syria); 223–187 BC	Succeeded by Seleucus IV Philopator
