= Laodice I =

3rd-century BC Seleucid queen consort

- Queen consort of the Seleucid Empire
- Died: before 236 BC
- Spouse: Antiochus II Theos
- Issue: Seleucus II Callinicus; Antiochus Hierax; Apama; Stratonice of Cappadocia; Laodice
- Father: Achaeus

Laodice I (Greek: Λαοδίκη, Laodíkē, meaning "justice of the people"; flourished 3rd century BC) was a Greek noblewoman of Anatolia who was a close relative of the early Seleucid dynasty and was the first wife of the Seleucid Greek King Antiochus II Theos.

== Family background ==
Laodice was the daughter of Achaeus, a wealthy nobleman who owned estates in Anatolia. Her mother is unknown. Her family had power in Anatolia with strong royal connections. She had one sister, Antiochis, who mothered Attalus I of Pergamon.

Her father, Achaeus, was the second son of King Seleucus I Nicator and his first wife, Apama I. Her name implies a strong Seleucid connection, as she was the namesake of her paternal aunt and her paternal great-grandmother of this name.

== Life and marriage ==
Her birth date is unknown, and little is known on her early life. Laodice I married her paternal first cousin Antiochus II Theos before 266 BC as his first wife. She married Antiochus II before he was the heir to the Seleucid throne.

When her paternal uncle Antiochus I Soter died in 261 BC, Antiochus II succeeded his father. Through her marriage, Laodice I became a Seleucid queen. Little is known on her relationship with Antiochus II. Laodice I bore her husband two sons: Seleucus II Callinicus and Antiochus Hierax, and three daughters: Apama, Stratonice of Cappadocia and Laodice.

== Divorce with Antiochus II ==
In 252 BC after the Second Syrian War, Antiochus II was obliged to make peace with the Egyptian Greek Pharaoh Ptolemy II Philadelphus. Antiochus made peace with the Pharaoh by divorcing Laodice and marrying the daughter of Ptolemy II, Berenice, with the understanding that any children born from their union would inherit the Seleucid throne.

Although she was no longer queen, Laodice was still a very powerful and political influential figure. In their divorce settlement, Antiochus gave Laodice various land grants throughout Anatolia which are known through inscriptions. Laodice I owned a large estate in the Hellespont, other properties near Cyzicus, Ilion and in Caria. In a royal record at Sardis mentions her land titles were to be kept as royal land in disposal in grants or sales.

In a clause in the divorce settlement, Laodice was allowed to sell or donate land in which she had the right to choose which attachment of a city were to be passed on to the new landlord, unless Laodice had taken care of the matter herself. Antiochus gave her a grace period to settle matters on her land before she decided whether to hold on to the land or dispose it. She may have been given the revenue of two harvests with which to pay a nominal purchase price to set at the valuation of the land for tax purposes. When Laodice was able to make payment, the land she intended to purchase could remain part of royal land and couldn't be made as a part of an attachment to a city. The only one who could order to reallocate or rearrange land lots was the King.

When Laodice sold a land attachment, the new owner was not permitted to remove it from the city or attach it to another. As she was a former queen, as a part of a land sale she possessed everything on the land that was transferred to her during the sale. She collected revenue from annual agriculture harvests and other forms from her lands. Antiochus, on one occasion, granted Laodice a complete property tax exemption.

== Deaths of Antiochus II and his second family ==
During Antiochus II's marriage to Berenice, they had a son called Antiochus. Laodice lived at Ephesus. On 28 January 246 BC, Ptolemy II died, and was succeeded by Ptolemy III Euergetes. After the death of Ptolemy II, Antiochus II left his second family in Antioch and returned to Laodice. He named his first son with Laodice as his successor to the throne.

In July 246 BC, Antiochus II died (some suggest that he was poisoned by a revengeful Laodice) leaving a confusing dynastic situation. Seleucus II succeeded his father as king and his brother Antiochus Hierax was named co-ruler in Sardis. They lived with Laodice at Ephesus. Laodice, either for revenge or to prevent civil war, had Berenice and her son murdered in the late summer of 246 BC.

Out of his outrage, the brother of Berenice, Ptolemy III, declared war the same year and invaded the Seleucid Empire. His suspicions about the deaths of his sister and nephew were firmly grounded and were a part of the cause of the Third Syrian War also known as the ‘Laodicean War’ or the ‘War of Laodice’. During the war, while Seleucus was fighting Ptolemy, Laodice supported the revolt of her second son against her first son. This occurred in 244 BC which caused a civil war for the next 17 years between Seleucus II and Antiochus Hierax. Eventually, Ptolemy captured Laodice and had her killed. This happened no earlier than 236 BC because there are two honorific inscriptions in Babylon dedicated to her dated to 247 BC and 237 BC.

== Sources ==
- Laodice I article at Livius.org
- Antiochus II Theos article at Livius.org
- Seleucus I Nicator article at Livius.org
- Seleukid Genealogies and Biographies - Antiochos II
- Seleucid genealogy
- R.A. Billows, Kings and Colonists: Aspects of Macedonian Imperialism, Brill, 1995
- G.W. Bromiley, International Standard Bible Encyclopedia: A-D, Wm. B. Eerdmans Publishing, 1995
- J.D. Grainger, A Seleukid Prosopography and Gazetteer, Brill, 1997
- G.G. Aperghis, The Seleukid Royal Economy: The Finances and Financial Administration of the Seleukid Empire, Cambridge University Press, 2004
- A. Coșkun, "Laodike I, Berenike Phernophoros, Dynastic Murders, and the Outbreak of the Third Syrian War (253-246 BC)," in: Seleukid Royal Women: Creation, Representation and Distortion of Hellenistic Queenship in the Seleukid Empire, ed. by A.Coșkun and A. McAuley, Steiner, 2016, 107-134

== See also ==
- Belevi Mausoleum
