= Achaeus of Syracuse =

4th-century BC Greek playwright

Achaeus of Syracuse (Ancient Greek: Ἀχαιός ὁ Συρακούσιος; lived 4th century BC) was an ancient Greek tragedian native of Syracuse, Magna Graecia. The Suda ascribes to him 10 plays, while the Pseudo-Eudocia 14. He may be the "Achaios" who won a victory at Athens' Lenaia festival in 356 BC.
