= Seleucus III Ceraunus =

Ruler of the Seleucid Kingdom from 225 to 223 BC

- Basileus
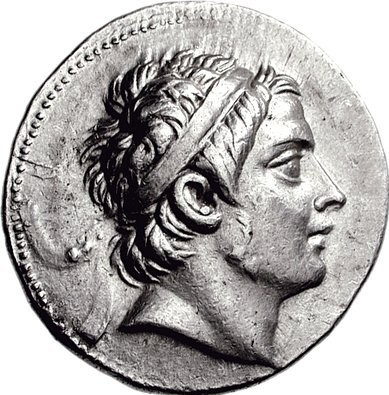
- Silver tetradrachm of Seleukos III Keraunos, minted in Antioch, featuring a portrait of Seleukos on the obverse. SC 921.1

Basileus of the Seleucid Empire
- Reign: 226/225 – summer 223 BC
- Predecessor: Seleucus II Callinicus
- Successors: Antiochus III the Great
- Born: Alexander; 244 or 243 BC
- Died: summer 223 BC
- Dynasty: Seleucid
- Father: Seleucus II Callinicus
- Mother: Laodice II

Seleucus III Ceraunus (Ancient Greek: Σέλευκος Κεραυνός, Séleukos Keraunós), later also known as Soter (Ancient Greek: Σωτήρ, Sōtḗr; born 244 or 243 BCE; died 223 BCE in Phrygia), was the eldest son of Seleucus II Callinicus and Laodice II, and for a few years—between 226/5 and 223 BCE—king of the Seleucid Empire. His epithets mean "Thunderbolt" and "Savior," while his birth name was Alexander. In 225 BCE, following the death of his father Seleucus II—who succumbed to injuries from a fall from his horse—Seleucus III succeeded him as king of the Seleucid Empire. In 223 BCE, he was assassinated in Asia Minor by courtiers during a campaign against Attalus I of Pergamon. His brother Antiochus subsequently ascended the throne.

== Biography ==
Seleucus III was born in either 243 or 244 BCE under the name Alexander, as the son of Seleucus II and Laodice. After his father's death in 226/5 BCE, he assumed the Seleucid throne and adopted the regnal name Seleucus. He was given the epithet Ceraunus by his soldiers. Upon his accession, he immediately began military preparations to reconquer the territories in Asia Minor that had broken away from the empire under Antiochus Hierax in 240 BCE and were subsequently annexed by Attalus I of Pergamon.

His initial strategy—to dispatch generals across the Taurus Mountains—is inferred from Pergamene inscriptions that celebrate two victories of King Attalus I over the strategoi (στρατηγοί) of Seleucus. The name of one of these defeated generals appears to have begun with the letter "Ε-" and has been considered by some scholars to be identical to Epigenes, who is mentioned by Polybius in other contexts and who later fell victim to an intrigue by the general Hermeias. This identification is now largely discredited for various reasons. Another general may have been the king's uncle, Andromachus. His capture by Attalus and subsequent transfer to the Attelid allies in Alexandreia would at least explain why he was later interned there. These campaigns may also have included alliances with local dynasts.

Following these initial defeats, Seleucus decided to intervene personally. In 223 BCE, he appointed the Carian Hermeias as regent and crossed the Taurus Mountains with a large army under the command of his relative Achaeus. However, before a decisive battle with Attalus could take place, Seleucus found himself in a dire situation in Phrygia. Lacking funds, suffering from political weakness and military incompetence, he was unable to maintain discipline in his forces, and in the summer of 223 BCE, he fell victim to a conspiracy orchestrated by the Galatian Apaturius and a certain Nicanor. According to Appian, his reign lasted two years, whereas the Eusebian tradition gives three years. After his death, Epigenes led a significant portion of the army back to Syria.

Seleucus III died without issue; the existence of a son named Antiochus, as postulated by Droysen based on numismatic evidence and the priest list of Seleuceia Pieria, has been refuted by later scholarship. The coinage of Seleucus, like that of his father, displays a very limited variety of types: his own portrait, Apollo or Artemis on the obverse, and Apollo on the reverse. The cultic title Soter does not appear on Seleucus’ coinage, nor in the dynastic cult of his brother Antiochus III, and only appears during the reign of the latter's son, Seleucus IV.

After Seleucus III's death, the diadem was initially offered to his relative Achaeus, who had gained the army's trust by killing the conspirators. However, Achaeus declined kingship, thereby enabling the accession of Seleucus’ younger brother Antiochus. Continuing the campaign begun by Seleucus III, Achaeus rapidly advanced through Asia Minor. Despite the recall of a significant portion of the army to Syria after Seleucus’ death, Achaeus eventually succeeded in besieging Attalus in his capital city of Pergamon.

Seleucus III Ceraunus Seleucid dynasty Born: c. 243 BC Died: 223 BC
Preceded by Seleucus II Callinicus	Seleucid King; 225–223 BC	Succeeded by Antiochus III the Great
