= Laodice II =

3rd-century BC Seleucid queen consort

- Queen consort of the Seleucid Empire
- Spouse: Seleucus II Callinicus
- Issue: Antiochis; Seleucus III Ceraunus; Antiochus III the Great
- Father: Achaeus

Laodice II (Ancient Greek: Λαοδίκη, romanized: Laodíkē; lived in the 3rd century BC), was the wife of Seleucus II Callinicus.

== Family ==
According to the express statement of Polybius, she was the sister of Andromachus and therefore the aunt of her husband. Laodice II bore Seleucus II Seleucus III Ceraunus and Antiochus III the Great.

== Anecdote ==
Polyaenus Strat. 8.61 has a curious story that may not be true, but calling Laodice another name: Mysta, he says "When Seleucus, surnamed Callinicus, was defeated by the Gauls at Ancyra in 237 (on behalf of Antiochus Hierax), and fell into the hands of the enemy, his wife Mysta threw aside her royal robe, put on the ragged dress of a lowly servant, and as such was sold amongst the prisoners. After having been conveyed amongst the rest of the slaves to Rhodes, there she revealed her true identity. The Rhodians immediately re-purchased her from the buyer, dressed her in a manner suitable to her rank, and conducted her to Antioch."
