= Apama =

4th-century BC Seleucid queen consort

- Queen consort of the Seleucid Empire
- Spouse: Seleucus I Nicator
- Issue: Apama of Sogdiana; Antiochus I Soter; Achaeus
- Father: Spitamenes or Artabazus

Apama (Ancient Greek: Ἀπάμα, romanized: Apáma), sometimes known as Apama I or Apame I, was a Sogdian noblewoman.

== Biography ==
The wife of the first ruler of the Seleucid Empire, Seleucus I Nicator, they married at Susa in 324 BC. According to Arrian, Apama was the daughter of the Sogdian baron Spitamenes. Strabo, on the other hand, makes her a daughter of Artabazus. Apame was the only of the Susa wives to become queen as, unlike the other generals, Seleucus kept her after Alexander's death.

Apama had three children with her husband: Antiochus I Soter (who inherited the Seleucid throne), Achaeus, and a daughter also called Apama.

Circa 300-297 BC, Seleucus married Stratonice, daughter of Demetrius I of Macedon, by whom he had a daughter called Phila. According to Malalas's chronicle, he married her after the death of Apama but, according to other sources, she was still alive, as the people of Miletus honored her with a statue that year.

According to Appian (57–8), her husband named three cities Apamea after her. Modern scholars consider them to be Apamea on the Orontes River, Apamea in the Euphrates, and Apamea in Media.
