= Antiochus I Soter =

Ruler of the Seleucid Empire from 281 to 261 BC

Antiochus I
- Basileus; King of the Universe
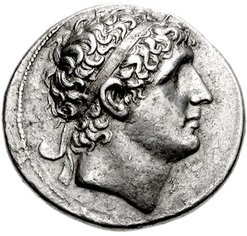
- Silver tetradrachm of Antiochus I Soter, minted in Magnesia on Mt. Sipylus, featuring a portrait of Antiochus on the obverse. SC 318c

Basileus of the Seleucid Empire
- Reign: September 281 – 2 June 261 BC
- Predecessor: Seleucus I Nicator
- Successor: Antiochus II Theos
- Born: c. 324 BC; Babylon, Macedon
- Died: 2 June 261 BC (aged 62-63)
- Spouse: Stratonice
- Issue: Seleucus; Laodice; Apama II; Stratonice II; Antiochus II Theos
- Dynasty: Seleucid dynasty
- Father: Seleucus I Nicator
- Mother: Apama
- Religion: Mesopotamian religion and Greek polytheism

Antiochus I Soter (Ancient Greek: Ἀντίοχος Σωτήρ, Antíochos Sōtér; "Antiochus the Savior"; c. 324/3 – 2 June 261 BC) was a Seleucid king of the Seleucid Empire. Antiochus succeeded his father Seleucus I Nicator in 281 BC and reigned during a period of instability which he mostly overcame until his death on 2 June 261 BC. He is the last known ruler to be attributed the ancient Mesopotamian title King of the Universe.

== Biography ==
Antiochus's father was Seleucus I Nicator and his mother was Apama, daughter of Spitamenes, being one of the princesses whom Alexander the Great had given as wives to his generals in 324 BC. The Seleucids fictitiously claimed that Apama was the daughter of Darius III, in order to legitimise themselves as the inheritors of both the Achaemenids and Alexander, and therefore the rightful lords of western and central Asia.

In 294 BC, prior to the death of his father Seleucus I, Antiochus married his stepmother, Stratonice, daughter of Demetrius Poliorcetes. The ancient sources report that his elderly father reportedly instigated the marriage after discovering that his son was in danger of dying of lovesickness. Stratonice bore five children to Antiochus: Seleucus (later executed for rebellion), Laodice, Apama II, Stratonice II and Antiochus II Theos, who succeeded his father as king.

The Ruin of Esagila Chronicle, dated between 302 and 281 BC, mentions that a crown prince, most likely Antiochus, decided to rebuild the ruined Babylonian temple Esagila, and made a sacrifice in preparation. However, while there, he stumbled on the rubble and fell. He then ordered his troops to destroy the last of the remains.

On the assassination of his father in 281 BC, the task of holding together the empire was a formidable one. A revolt in Syria broke out almost immediately. Antiochus was soon compelled to make peace with his father's murderer, Ptolemy Ceraunus, apparently abandoning Macedonia and Thrace. In Anatolia he was unable to reduce Bithynia or the Persian dynasty that ruled in the Kingdom of Cappadocia.

In 278 BC the Gauls broke into Anatolia, and the victory that Antiochus won over these Gauls by using Indian war elephants (275 BC) is said to have been the origin of his title of Soter (Greek for "saviour").

At the end of 275 BC the question of Coele-Syria, which had been open between the houses of Seleucus and Ptolemy since the partition of 301 BC, led to hostilities (the First Syrian War). It had been continuously in Ptolemaic occupation, but the house of Seleucus maintained its claim. War did not materially change the outlines of the two kingdoms, though frontier cities like Damascus and the coast districts of Asia Minor might change hands.

Cylinder of Antiochus I

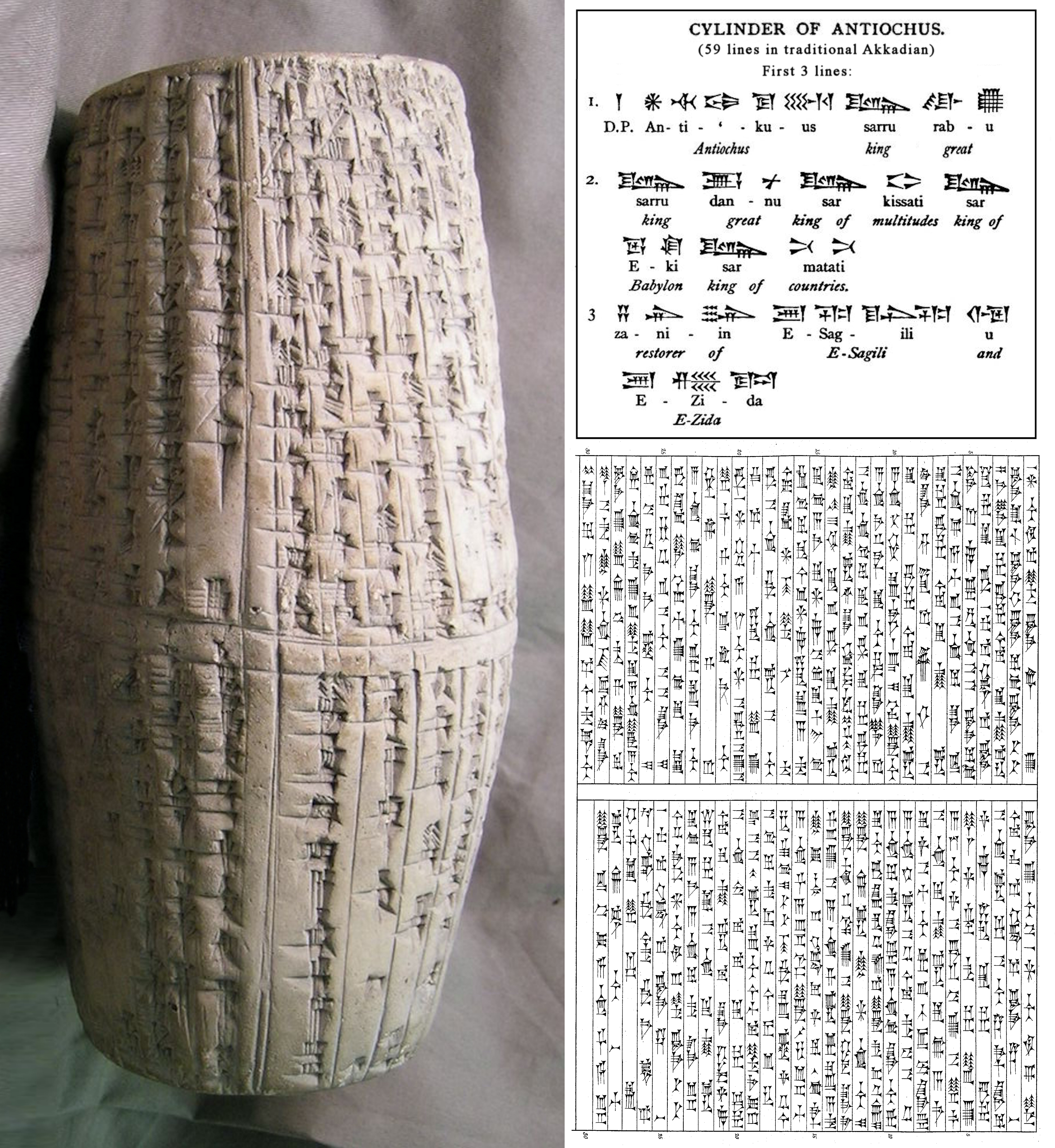
Cylinder of Antiochus, as great king of kings of Babylon, restorer of the temples E-sagila and E-zida. Written in traditional Akkadian, a voluntary archaism meant to convey prestige.

In 268 BC Antiochus I laid the foundation for the Ezida Temple in Borsippa. His eldest son Seleucus had ruled in the east as viceroy from c. 275 BC until 268/267 BC; Antiochus put his son to death in the latter year on the charge of rebellion. Around 262 BC Antiochus tried to break the growing power of Pergamum by force of arms, but suffered defeat near Sardis and died soon afterwards. He was succeeded in 261 BC by his second son Antiochus II Theos.

=== City of Ai-Khanoum ===
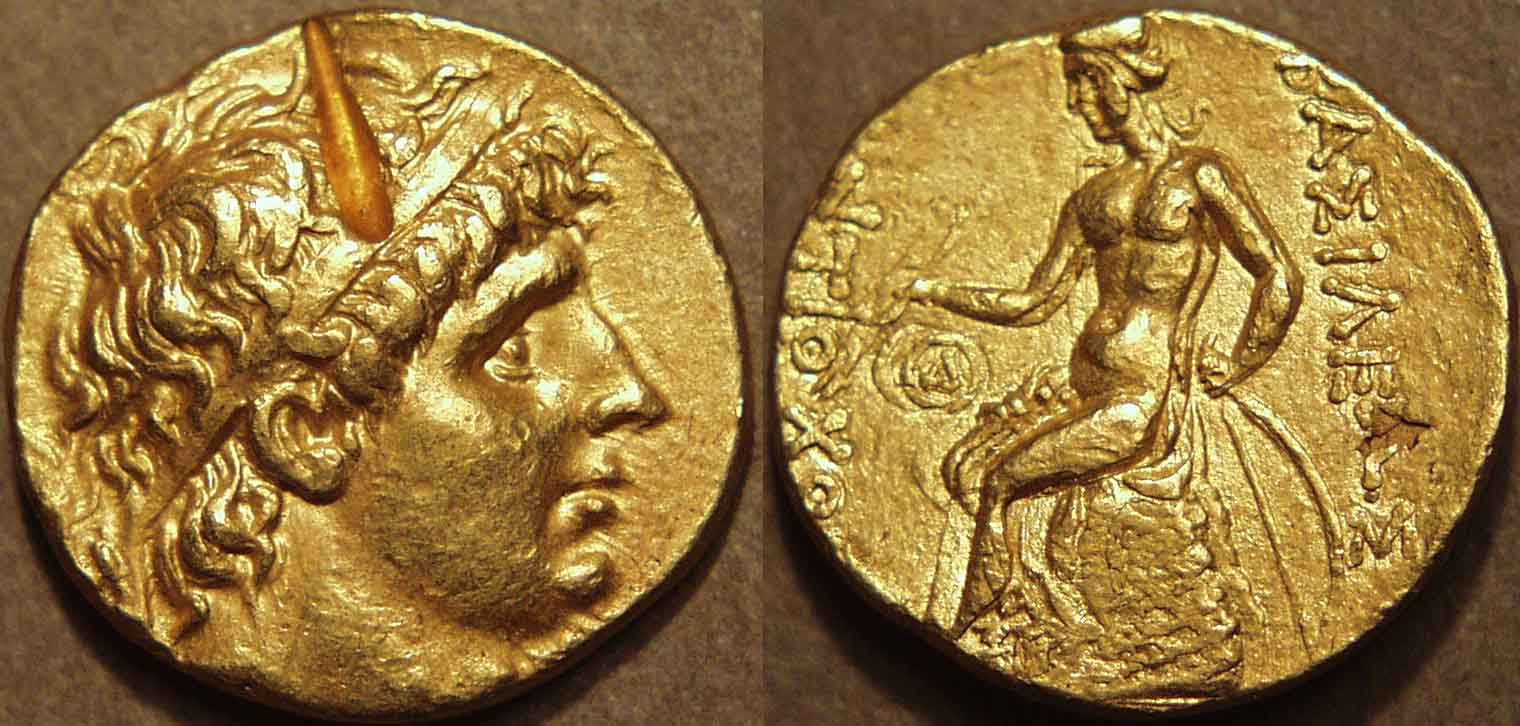
Gold coin of Antiochus I Soter, from Ai-Khanoum. Obverse shows Antiochus I wearing a diadem. Reverse shows nude Apollo seated on omphalos, holding bow and arrows. Greek legend reads: BAΣIΛEΩΣ ANTIOXOY, Basileōs Antiochou – "(Of) King Antiochus".

Recent analysis strongly suggests that the Greek city of Ai-Khanoum, located in Takhar Province, northern Afghanistan, at the confluence of the Panj River and the Kokcha River and at the doorstep of the Indian subcontinent, was founded c. 280 BC by Antiochus I.

=== Relations with India ===
Antiochus I maintained friendly diplomatic relations with Bindusara, ruler of the Maurya Empire of India. Deimachos of Plateia was the ambassador of Antiochus at the court of Bindusara. The 3rd century Greek writer Athenaeus, in his Deipnosophistae, mentions an incident that he learned from Hegesander's writings: Bindusara requested Antiochus to send him sweet wine, dried figs and a sophist. Antiochus replied that he would send the wine and the figs, but the Greek laws forbade him to sell a sophist.

Antiochus is likely the Greek king mentioned in the Edicts of Ashoka, as one of the recipients of the Indian Emperor Ashoka's Buddhist proselytism:

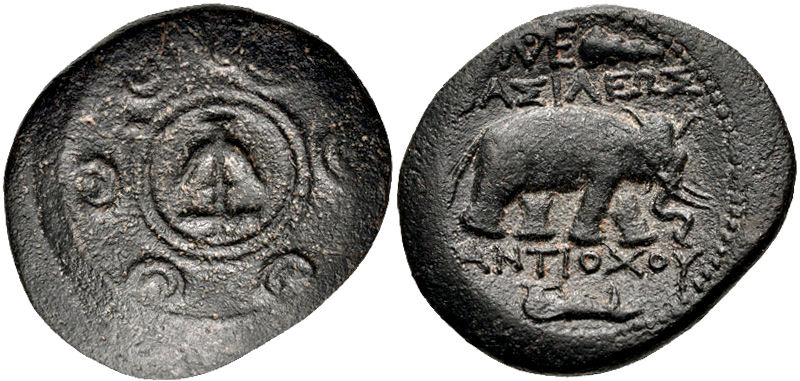
Antiochus I coin. Antioch mint. Macedonian shield with Seleucid anchor in central boss. Reverse with Elephant walking right. Greek legend reads: BAΣIΛEΩΣ ANTIOXOY, Basileōs Antiochou – "(Of) King Antiochus".

And even this conquest [preaching Buddhism] has been won by the Beloved of the Gods here and in all the borderlands, as far as six hundred yojanas (5,400–9,600 km) away, where Antiochus, king of the Yavanas [Greeks] rules, and beyond this Antiochus four kings named Ptolemy, Antigonos, Magas and Alexander rule.

Ashoka also claims that he encouraged the development of herbal medicine, for men and animals, in the territories of the Hellenic kings:

Everywhere within Beloved-of-the-Gods, King Piyadasi's [Ashoka's] domain, and among the people beyond the borders, the Cholas, the Pandyas, the Satiyaputras, the Keralaputras, as far as Tamraparni and where the Greek king Antiochus rules, and among the kings who are neighbors of Antiochos, everywhere has Beloved-of-the-Gods, King Piyadasi, made provision for two types of medical treatment: medical treatment for humans and medical treatment for animals. Wherever medical herbs suitable for humans or animals are not available, I have had them imported and grown. Wherever medical roots or fruits are not available I have had them imported and grown. Along roads I have had wells dug and trees planted for the benefit of humans and animals.

Alternatively, the Greek king mentioned in the Edict of Ashoka could also be Antiochus's son and successor, Antiochus II Theos, although the proximity of Antiochus I with the East may makes him a better candidate.

== Neoclassical art ==
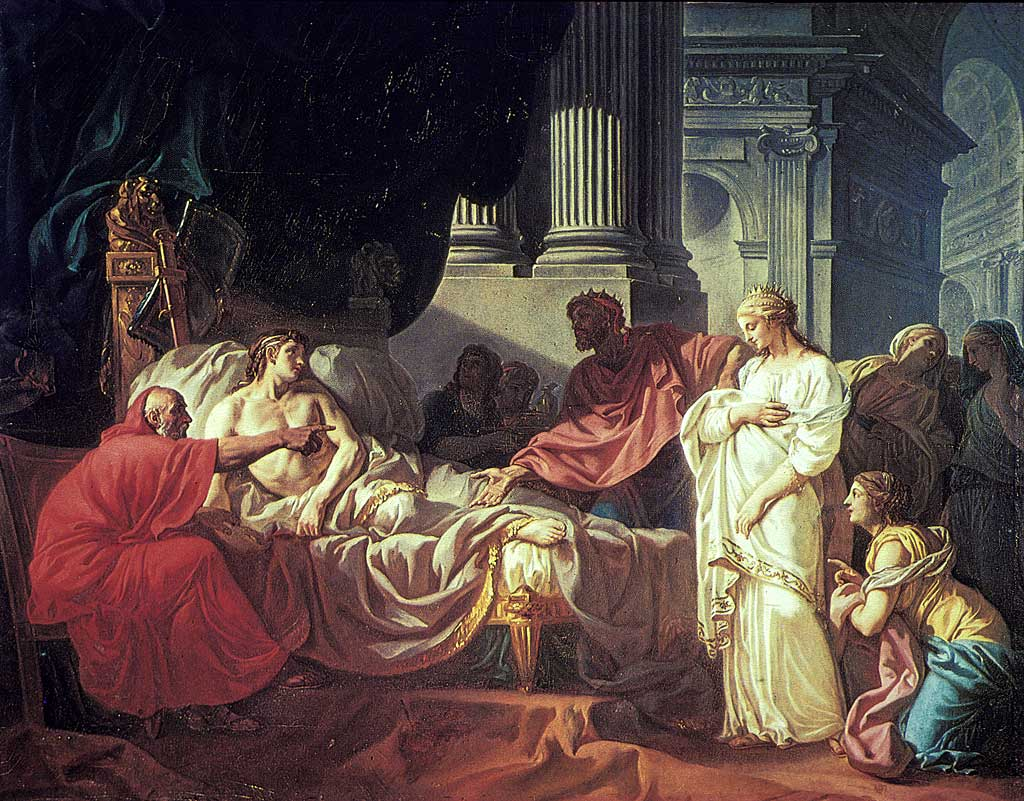
Antiochus and Stratonica (1774), Jacques-Louis David, École nationale supérieure des Beaux-Arts.

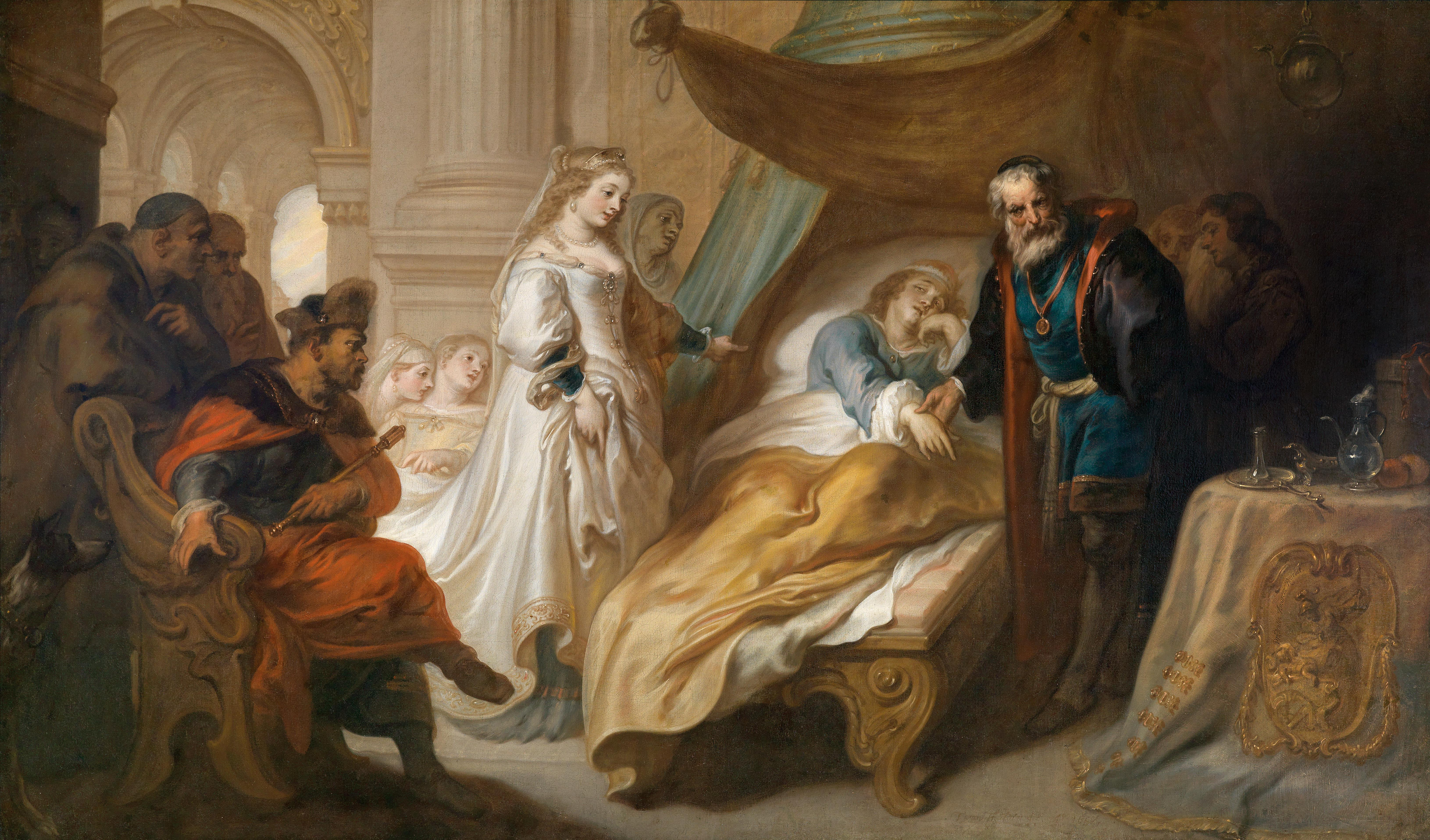
Antiochus und Stratonike, Theodoor van Thulden (1669).

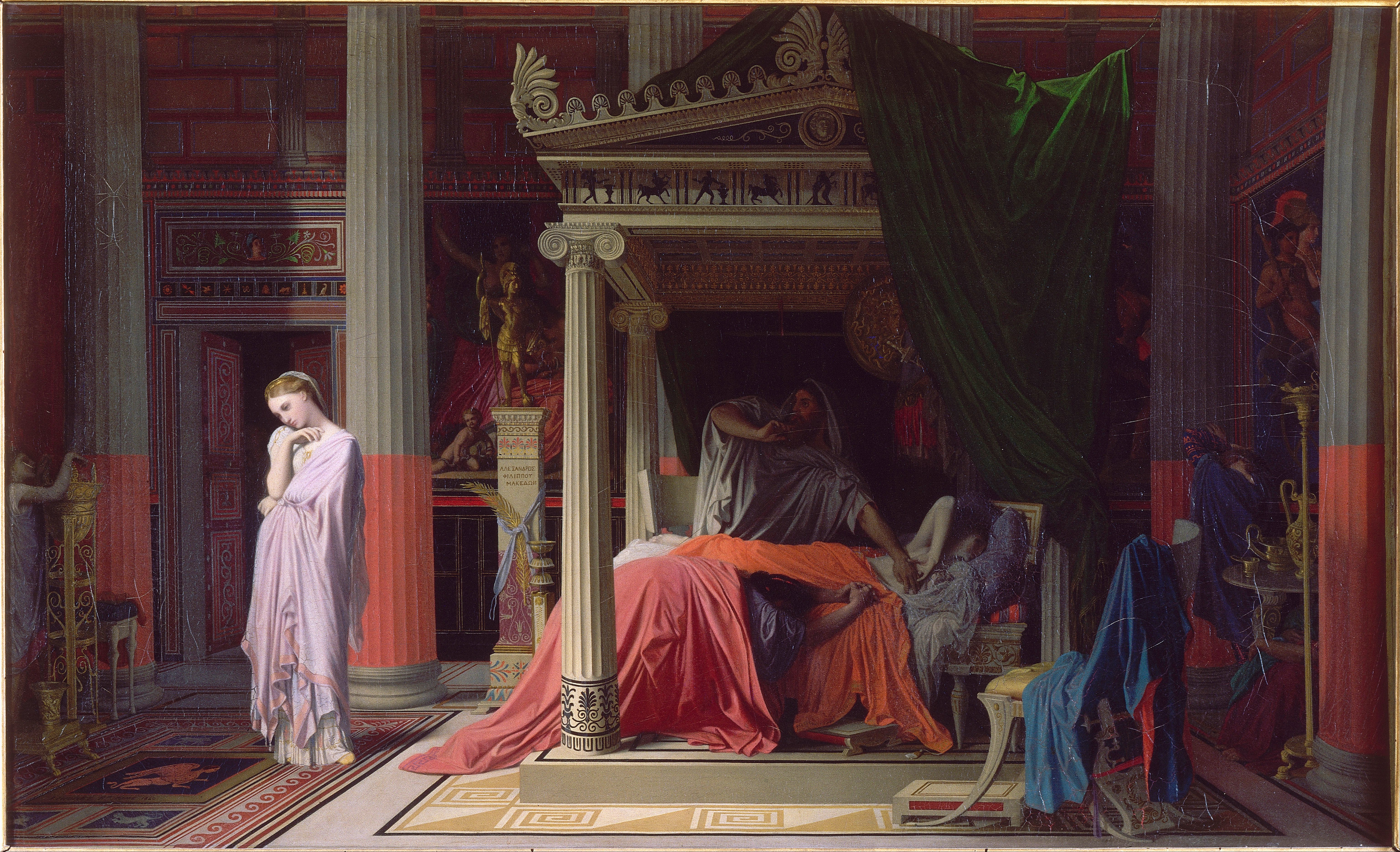
Antiochus and Stratonice by Jean-Auguste-Dominique Ingres.

The love between Antiochus and his stepmother Stratonice was often depicted in Neoclassical art, as in a painting by Jacques-Louis David.

== Bibliography ==
- Kosmin, Paul J. (2014), The Land of the Elephant Kings: Space, Territory, and Ideology in the Seleucid Empire, Harvard University Press, ISBN 978-0-674-72882-0
- Mookerji, Radha Kumud (1988) [first published in 1966], Chandragupta Maurya and his times (4th ed.), Motilal Banarsidass, ISBN 81-208-0433-3
- Traver, Andrew G. (2002). From Polis to Empire, the Ancient World, c. 800 B.C.-A.D. 500: A Biographical Dictionary. Greenwood Publishing Group. ISBN 9780313309427.

Antiochus I Soter Seleucid dynasty Born: c. 324/323 BC Died: 261 BC
Preceded by Seleucus I Nicator	Seleucid ruler 281–261 BC	Succeeded by Antiochus II Theos
