= Antiochus II Theos =

King of the Seleucid Empire, 261–246 BC

- Basileus
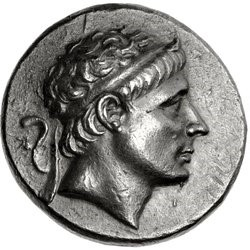
- Silver tetradrachm of Antiochus II Theos, minted in Tarsus, featuring a portrait of Antiochus on the obverse. SC 561

Basileus of the Seleucid Empire
- Reign: 2 June 261 – July 246 BC
- Predecessor: Antiochus I Soter
- Successor: Seleucus II Callinicus
- Born: 286 BC; Syria
- Died: early July 246 BC (aged 39–40); Asia Minor (modern-day Turkey)
- Spouse: Laodice I Berenice
- Issue: with Laodice: Seleucus II Callinicus; Antiochus Hierax; Apama; Stratonice of Cappadocia; Laodice with Berenice: Antiochus
- Dynasty: Seleucid dynasty
- Father: Antiochus I Soter
- Mother: Stratonice
- Religion: Greek polytheism

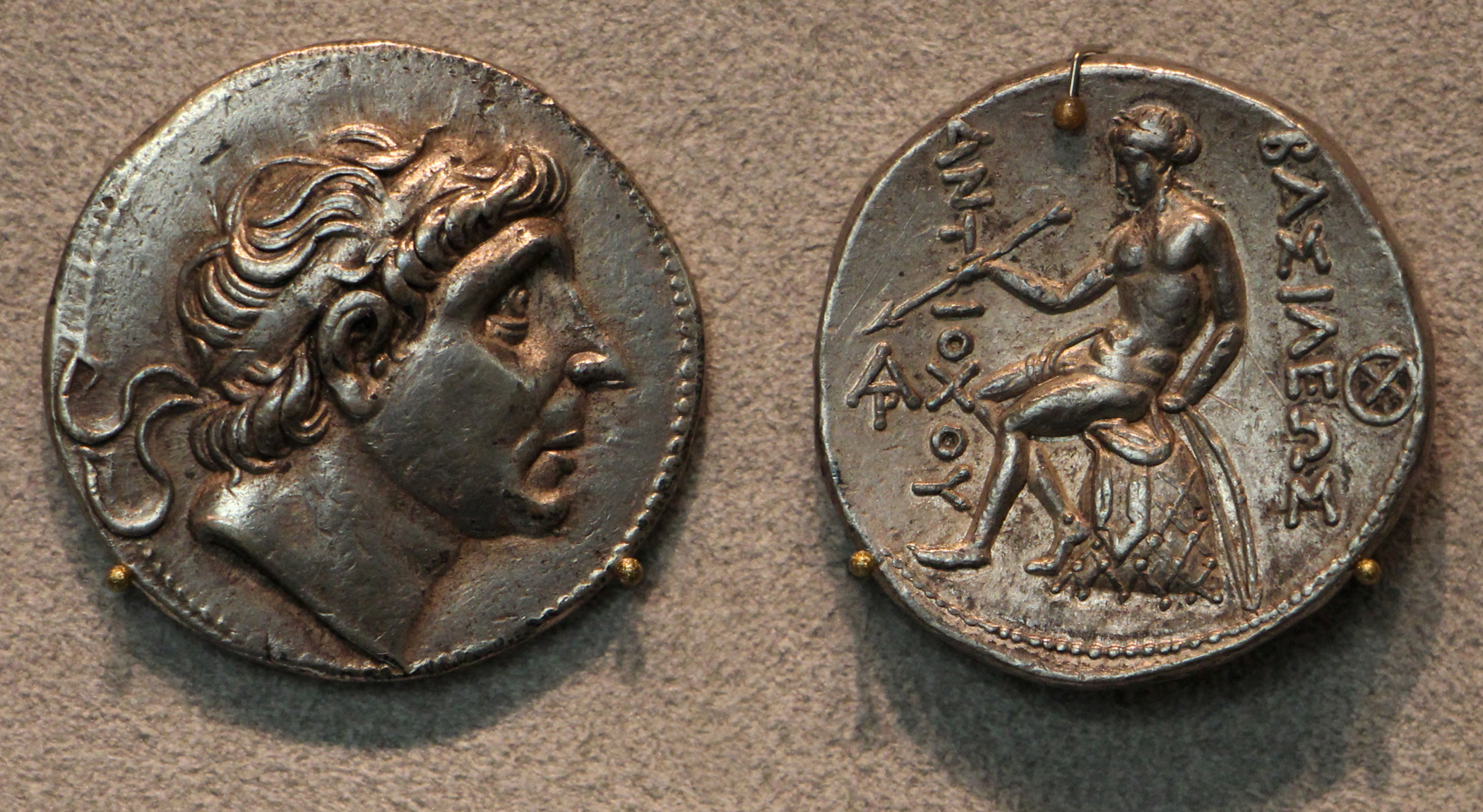
Coin of Antiochus II. The Greek inscription reads ΒΑΣΙΛΕΩΣ ΑΝΤΙΟΧΟΥ, Basileōs Antiochou, "of king Antiochus".

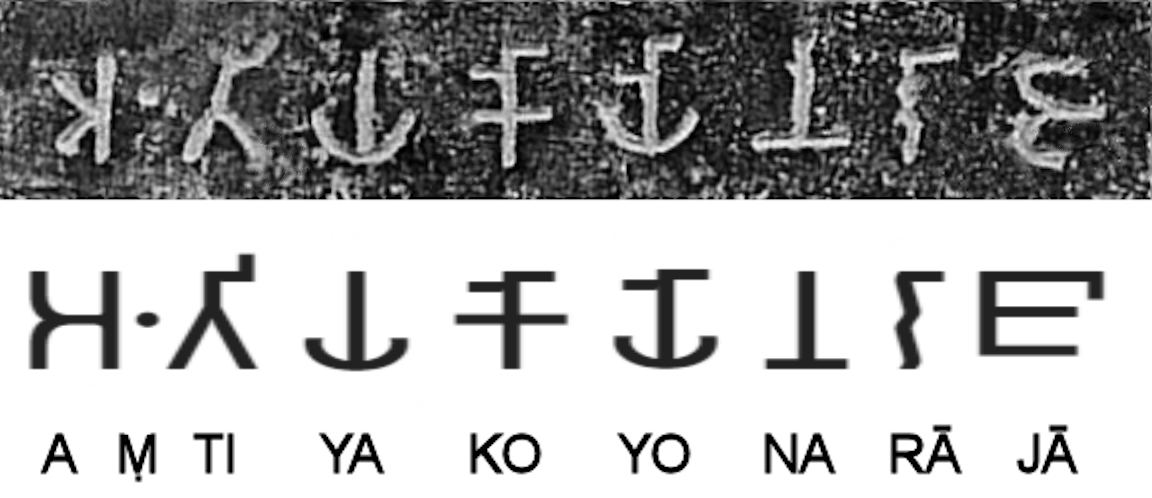
"Aṃtiyako Yona Rājā" (𑀅𑀁𑀢𑀺𑀬𑀓𑁄 𑀬𑁄𑀦 𑀭𑀸𑀚𑀸, "The Greek king Antiochos"), mentioned in Major Rock Edict No.2 of Ashoka, here at Girnar, Gujarat, India. Brahmi script.

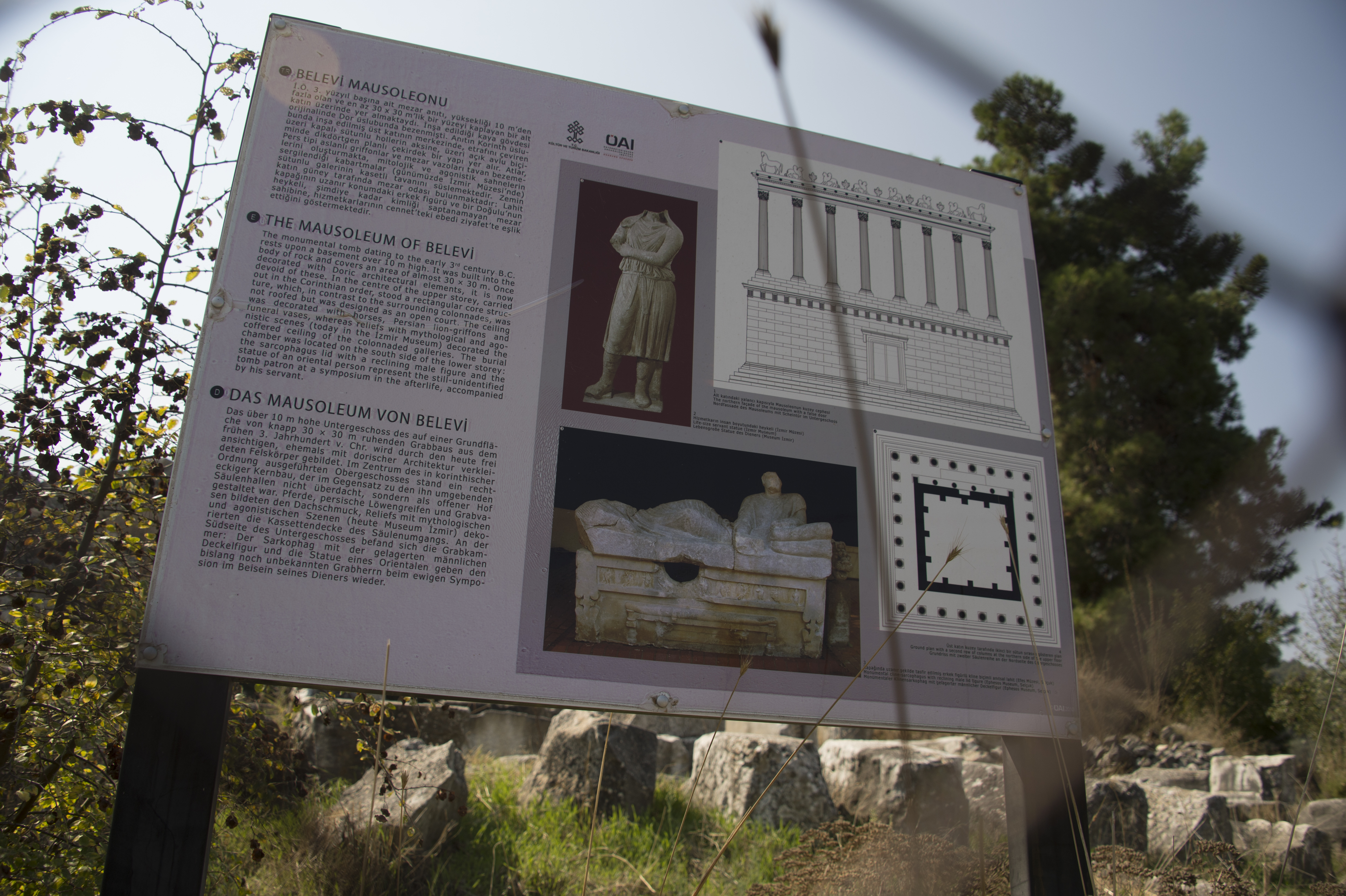
Belevi mausoleum

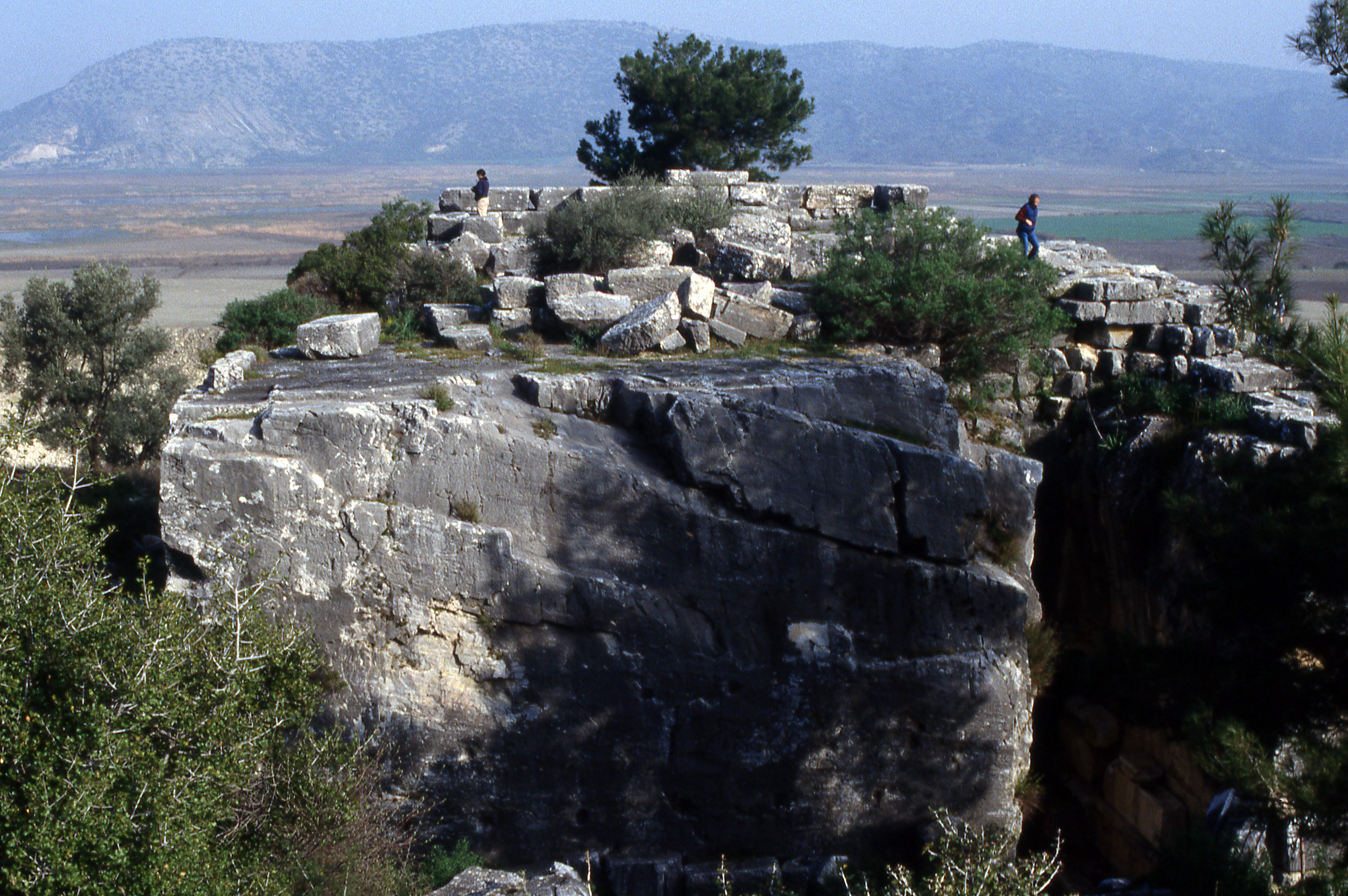
Belevi mausoleum from the south

Antiochus II Theos (Ancient Greek: Ἀντίοχος ὁ Θεός, Antíochos ho Theós, meaning "Antiochus the God"; 286 – July 246 BC) was a Greek king of the Hellenistic Seleucid Empire who reigned from 261 to 246 BC. He succeeded his father Antiochus I Soter in the winter of 262–61 BC. He was the younger son of Antiochus I and princess Stratonice, the daughter of Demetrius Poliorcetes.

Antiochus II was a forceful personality who in his lifetime largely succeeded to hold the sprawling Seleucid realm intact. However his fateful decision to repudiate his first wife Laodice and marry a Ptolemaic princess Berenice as part of a peace treaty led to a succession struggle after his death that would shake the empire's foundations and cause large territorial losses.

== Early life ==
Antiochus II was the younger son of Antiochus I Soter and his famous queen Stratonice. Antiochus was initially not expected to inherit the throne, but in 267 BC his father had his elder brother Seleucus executed on charges of rebellion.

== Reign ==
He inherited lasting tensions with Ptolemaic Egypt and soon initiated the Second Syrian War in alliance with Antigonus II of the Antigonid dynasty. The war was largely fought along the coasts of Asia Minor and conflated with the constant intrigues of petty despots and restless city-states in Asia Minor. Antiochus II made some gains in Asia Minor and acquired direct access to Aegean Sea by capturing Miletus and Ephesus. During the war he assumed the title Theos (Greek: Θεός, "God"), being such to the Milesians in slaying the tyrant Timarchus. At around the same time Antiochus II also made some attempt to get a footing in Thrace which details are largely unknown and a mint in the city of Byzantium briefly issued coins in his name.

In the end the war did little to alter the general balance of power in the Eastern Mediterranean. Coele-Syria in particular, the main disputed territory between the Seleucid empire and the Ptolemaic Kingdom, remained firmly in the hands of the Ptolemies. In 257 BC, the Ptolemaic pharaoh Ptolemy II Philadelphus even invaded the Seleucid-held part of Syria, though the outcome of this invasion is unknown. In 253 BC, with his Antigonid allies knocked out of the war by rebellions, Antiochus II made peace with Ptolemy II. As part of the settlement, Antiochus II divorced Laodice and married Ptolemy II's daughter Berenice, with the understanding that any children born from their union would inherit the Seleucid throne. Laodice was well provided for in the divorce arrangement. Antiochus II gave her various land grants throughout Anatolia which are known through inscriptions; such as large estates in the Hellespont, other properties near Cyzicus, Ilion and in Caria. She was also granted revenues from various territories and tax exemptions. According to a royal record at Sardis, her land titles were to be treated as in royal possession.

Laodice remained a very powerful and political influential figure and continued numerous intrigues to become queen again. By 246 BC, possibly at the news of Ptolemy II's death, Antiochus II had left Berenice and their infant son Antiochus in Antioch to live again with Laodice in Asia Minor. Antiochus II soon suddenly died and Laodice was widely accused of having him poisoned. Antiochus was buried in the Belevi Mausoleum.

A succession struggle erupted almost immediately. Berenice initially had the advantage by holding Antioch but her son Antiochus was but an infant. Meanwhile, Laodice proclaimed her eldest son Seleucus as king Seleucus II and moved in from Asia Minor, claiming that on his deathbed Antiochus II reversed his earlier decision and named Seleucus as his successor. The then-reigning brother of Berenice Ptolemy III marched from Egypt to support his sister, only to find her and her son murdered by partisans of Laodice. Enraged Ptolemy continued the war, dubbed the Third Syrian War which proved to be a disaster for the Seleucid empire.

== Eastern affairs ==
Very little is known about any Antiochus II's activities in regards to the eastern Upper Satrapies such as Media, Parthia, Bactria or Persis. Chiefly preoccupied with conflicts in the Eastern Mediterranean and with family issues, Antiochus II seems to have resorted to appointing independent-minded men such like Diodotus and Andragoras as satraps in the area. These two appointments eventually resulted in the creation of the independent Greco-Bactrian Kingdom and the Parthian Empire respectively. There is also a marked decline in quantity of Antiochus II's coinage in Bactria when compared to that of his father, which had been interpreted variously in scholarship. It has been claimed that ambitious satraps may have taken advantage of Antiochus II's absenteeism to gradually weaken their ties with the central government even in Antiochus II's lifetime without outwardly proclaiming independence. However, posthumous coinage of a popular king was a relatively common practice in the Hellenistic Age and Antiochus II may have minted coins in the name of his half-Sogdian father in order to legitimize both himself and his dynasty.

== Possible relations with India ==
An uncertain Antiochus is mentioned in the Edicts of Ashoka, as one of the recipients of the Indian Emperor Ashoka's Buddhist proselytism. A majority opinion however holds that the Greek king mentioned there is in fact be Antiochus II's father, Antiochus I Soter, who arguably had more proximity with the East.

== Notes ==
Antiochus II Theos Seleucid dynasty Born: 286 BC Died: 246 BC
Preceded by Antiochus I Soter	Seleucid King; 261–246 BC	Succeeded by Seleucus II Callinicus
