= Seleucus II Callinicus =

Ruler of the Seleucid Empire from 246 BC to 225 BC

Seleucus II Callinicus Pogon
- Basileus
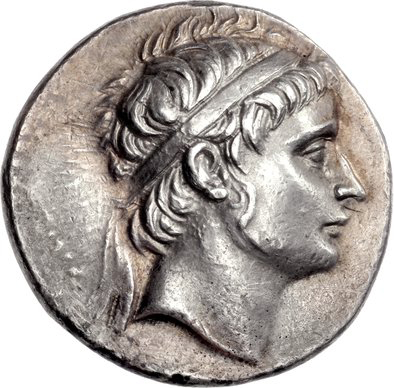
- Silver tetradrachm of Seleukos II Kallinikos, minted in Antioch, featuring a portrait of Seleukos on the obverse. SC 689.6b

Basileus of the Seleucid Empire
- Reign: July/August 246 – December 225 BC
- Predecessor: Antiochus II Theos
- Successor: Seleucus III Ceraunus
- Rival kings: Antiochus (240-226 BC); Andragoras (245-238 BC)
- Born: c. 265 BC
- Died: December 225 BC (aged 39–40)
- Spouse: Laodice II
- Issue: Five children with Laodice II, including: Antiochis; Seleucus III Ceraunus; Antiochus III the Great
- Dynasty: Seleucid
- Father: Antiochus II
- Mother: Laodice I

Seleucus II Callinicus Pogon (Greek: Σέλευκος Β΄ ὁ Καλλίνικος ὁ Πώγων; Callinicus meaning "beautifully triumphant", Pogon meaning "the Beard"; July/August 265 BC – December 225 BC), was a ruler of the Hellenistic Seleucid Empire, who reigned from 246 BC to 225 BC. Faced with multiple enemies on various fronts, and not always successful militarily, his reign was a time of great turmoil and fragmentation for the Seleucid Empire, before its eventual restoration under his second son and eventual successor, Antiochus III.

== Accession and invasion ==
After the death of his father, Antiochus II in July 246 BC, Seleucus was proclaimed king by his mother, Laodice in Ephesos, while his father's second wife, Queen Berenice, declared her son Antiochus king in Antioch. Berenice acted decisively at first, seizing control of most of Syria and Cilicia. However, before her brother Ptolemy III, the king of Egypt, was able to land and support her son's claims, she was murdered by partisans of Seleucus II and Queen Laodice.

This dynastic feud began the Third Syrian War. Ptolemy III invaded the Seleucid Empire and landing at Seleucia Pieria, accepted the surrender of Syria and Cilicia and marched victoriously to the Tigris or beyond (although he did not reach as far as Babylon). Ptolemy remained in Syria during the winter of 246-245 BC, while Seleucus sent an expedition by sea to retake the area, only to have it wrecked by storms; not the last time he was to be defeated by bad luck.

== Defeat in the Third Syrian war and Anatolia ==
Seleucus managed to maintain himself in the interior of Asia Minor and made arrangements to shore up his power there. One of his sisters married Mithridates II of Pontus, another married Ariarathes III of Cappadocia and he married his aunt Laodice II, by whom he had five children including Antiochis, Seleucus III Ceraunus and Antiochus III the Great. Seleucus then appointed his brother Antiochus Hierax as viceroy in Asia Minor and marched against the Ptolemies.

Ptolemy III returned to Egypt in 245 BC, reputedly taking with him 40,000 talents of gold and the statues of Egyptian gods which had been looted centuries before by the Persians. Seleucus crossed into Babylonia and Mesopotamia first, receiving the loyalty of the empire's Eastern regions and then marched into Syria where he recovered Antioch by 244 BC. This was followed by the recapture of the other major cities in the area. By 242 BC, the interior of Northern Syria had been regained and Seleucus was even able to launch raids into Ptolemaic controlled Syria around Damascus.

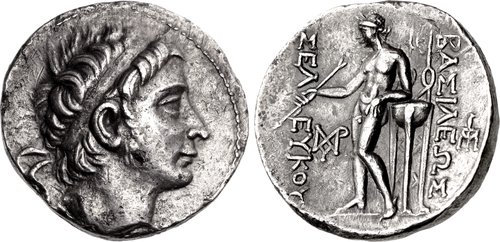
Silver coin of Seleucus II. Obverse shows the king wearing a royal diadem. Reverse shows Apollo leaning on a tripod, while holding an arrow. The Greek inscription reads: ΒΑΣΙΛΕΩΣ ΣΕΛΕΥΚΟΥ, Basileōs Seleukou, "of King Seleucus".

Elsewhere, the Seleucids were less successful. In the Aegean, the Ptolemaic armies were able to seize control of Ephesus, as well as Ainos and Maroneia in Thrace, and several cities on the Asian side of the Hellespont.

In 241 BC, peace was finally agreed and a treaty signed. Ptolemy recognised Seleucus as king and the Eleutheros river was once again accepted as the boundary between the two empires in Syria. Ptolemy did however retain his conquests in Thrace, Ephesus and, most importantly of all, the vital port of Seleucia Pieria. This city contained the tomb of the Seleucid dynasty's founder, Seleucus I, and controlled much of the trade from Antioch. The Seleucid desire to recover the city would prove to be one of the main causes of the outbreak of the Fourth Syrian war in 219 BC.

In the meantime, Antiochus Hierax, had set himself up as a rival in Asia Minor against Seleucus, supported by their domineering mother Laodice. Seleucus appears to have launched an attack against Antiochus Hierax, but was unable to take Sardis. After two years of stalemate, the brothers met at the Battle of Ancyra around 237 BC. With the support of Mithridates II of Pontus and the Galatians Antiochus Hierax was victorious and Seleucus was barely able to escape with his life. After this Seleucus left the country beyond the Taurus to his brother and the other powers of Anatolia and an uneasy peace between the two prevailed.

== Fragmentation in the East ==
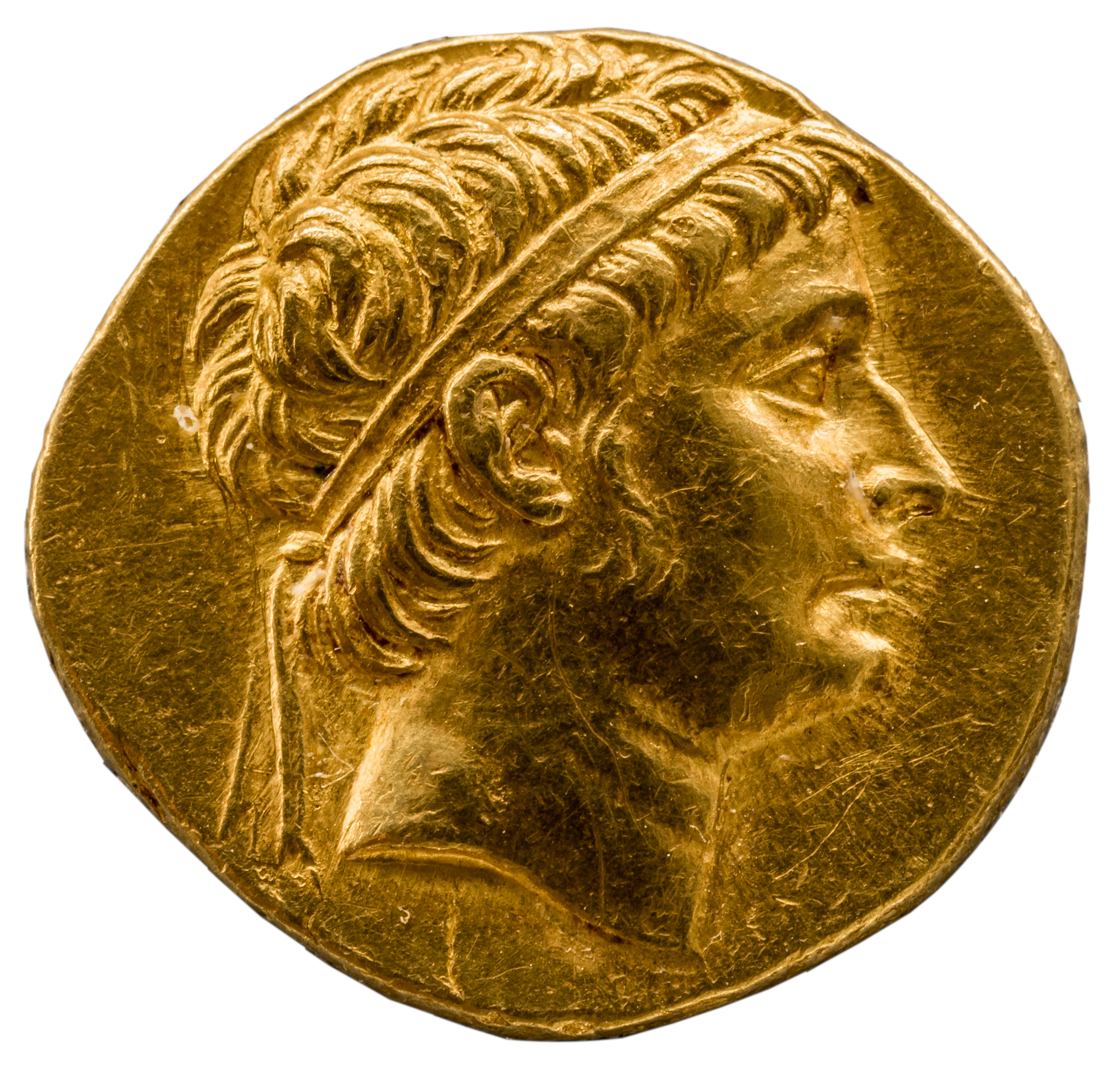
Gold stater of Seleucus II. Antioch mint, c. 261-246 BC.

Seleucus then turned to the problems which had developed in the Eastern provinces of the empire over the last few decades and undertook an expedition to regain Parthia, the results of which came to nothing.

The Parthian satrap Andragoras had taken the opportunity to establish de facto independence and had begun minting his own coins in 245 BC. However, before Seleucus was able to turn his attention eastwards, by 238 BC, Andragoras had been killed by Arsaces I, a chieftain of the nomadic Parni, based in the city of Nissa (modern day Nisa, Turkmenistan). Arsaces had previously attacked Bactria and been driven off by the satrap Diodotus I. Diodotus had also used the opportunity of Seleucid distraction in the West to gain de facto independence and set himself up as an independent ruler.

After the defeat at Ancyra, the Seleucid garrisons of the region were further weakened and this allowed the Parthians under Arsaces the opportunity to seize more territory, including the city of Hekatompylos, which became their new capital around 237 BC. Around this time Diodotus was succeeded by his son Diodotus II who agreed to an alliance with Parthia, which now acted as a useful barrier to any Seleucid invasion to recover the East.

It was after this that Seleucus attempted to recover Parthia, but the sources indicate he was defeated, or perhaps withdrew in the face of Parthian strength. The recovery of the Seleucid position in the East would have to wait until the reign of his son Antiochus III. Following this defeat Diodotus II declared himself king of Bactria, officially severing any remaining links with the Seleucid court in 235 BC.

== The death of Antiochus Hierax ==
Meanwhile, in Asia Minor, Pergamon now rose to greatness under Attalus I. Attalus' ambition to replace Antiochus Hierax as king of Asia Minor led to a major war and several battles during the 230s BC. In short order, Attalus defeated the Galatians, Antiochus Hierax and finally an attempt by Seleucus II to reclaim his control of Asia Minor. After being defeated by Attalus in four battles, Antiochus Hierax fled to Armenia, whose king gave him refuge. Antiochus Hierax then attempted to invade Mesopotamia. Andromachos, his mother's brother, commanded the Seleucid forces on this occasion and defeated him. Fleeing again, Antiochus finally perished in Thrace, where he was killed by robbers in c. 226 BC.

Seleucus by this time had his hands full dealing with rebellion in Antioch instigated by his aunt, Queen Stratonice, who had previously been married to King Demetrius II of Macedon. Upon returning to Syria after Demetrius II took another wife, Stratonice of Macedon proposed that she marry her nephew, or possibly demanded he avenge the insult to her honour by attacking Demetrius. In either case, Seleucus refused her suggestions and, infuriated, she raised Antioch in rebellion. Seleucus had to besiege the city, which he eventually recaptured. Stratonice fled to Seleucia, hoping to take refuge with Ptolemy III, but was captured en route and executed.

In the years after the defeat at Ancyra (237 BC), Seleucus focused on rebuilding his domains, expanding Antioch and suppressing rebellions in Babylon. By 227 BC, he had stabilised the situation enough to begin contemplating a new offensive against Attalus to retake Asia Minor.

== Death and succession ==
Before he could launch this invasion, Seleucus died unexpectedly in 225 BC as the result of a fall from his horse. He was succeeded firstly by his eldest son Alexander who took the name Seleucus III and later by a younger son Antiochus III the Great in 222 BC.

== Sources ==
Seleucus II Callinicus Seleucid dynasty Born: ? Died: 225 BC
Preceded by Antiochus II Theos	Seleucid ruler 246–225 BC	Succeeded by Seleucus III Ceraunus
