= Antiochus =

Antiochus (Ancient Greek: Ἀντίοχος) is a Greek male personal name, likely meaning "resolute in contention", or "unwavering". It is derived from the two words αντί ("against") and ὄχη ("support"). It was a dynastic name for rulers of the Seleucid Empire, and the kingdom of Commagene. In Jewish historical memory, connected with the Maccabean Revolt and the holiday of Hanukkah, "Antiochus" refers specifically to Antiochus IV Epiphanes.

Antiochus may refer to:

== The Seleucid Empire ==
- Antiochus (father of Seleucus I Nicator) (born 4th century BC), father of Seleucus I Nicator, founder of the Hellenistic Seleucid Empire
- Antiochus I Soter (died 261 BC), king of the Seleucid Empire
- Antiochus II Theos (286–246 BC), king of the Seleucid Empire who reigned 261–246 BC
- Antiochus Hierax (died 226 BC), rebel brother of Seleucus II Callinicus
- Antiochus III the Great (241–187 BC, king 222–187 BC), younger son of Seleucus II Callinicus, became the 6th ruler of the Seleucid Empire
  - Antiochus (son of Antiochus III the Great), the first son of Antiochus III the Great
- Antiochus IV Epiphanes (215–164 BC), ruler of the Seleucid Empire from 175 BC until 164 BC
- Antiochus V Eupator (173–162 BC), ruler of the Seleucid Empire who reigned 164–162 BC
- Antiochus VI Dionysus (148–138 BC), king of the Seleucid Empire, son of Alexander Balas and Cleopatra Thea
- Antiochus VII Sidetes (died 129 BC), king of the Seleucid Empire, reigned from 138 to 129 BC
- Antiochus VIII Grypus (died 96 BC), ruler of the Seleucid Empire, son of Demetrius II Nicator
- Antiochus IX Cyzicenus (died 96 BC), ruler of the Seleucid Empire, son of Antiochus VII Sidetes and Cleopatra Thea, half-brother of Antiochus VIII
- Antiochus X Eusebes (died 83 BC), ruler of the Seleucid Empire from 95 BC
- Antiochus XI Epiphanes (died 92 BC), ruler of the Seleucid Empire, son of Antiochus VIII Grypus and brother of Seleucus VI Epiphanes
- Antiochus XII Dionysus (Epiphanes/Philopator/Callinicus), ruler of the Seleucid Empire reigned 87–84 BC; fifth son of Antiochus VIII Grypus
- Antiochus XIII Asiaticus (died 64 BC), one of the last rulers of the Seleucid Empire
- Antiochus, the infant son of Antiochus II Theos
- Antiochus, first son of Seleucus IV Philopator

== Commagene ==
- Antiochus I of Commagene (died 38 BC), reigned 70–38 BC
- Antiochus II of Commagene (died 29 BC)
- Antiochus III of Commagene (died 17 AD), reigned 12 BC – 17 AD
- Antiochus IV of Commagene, reigned 38–72

=== Princes of Commagene ===
- Gaius Julius Archelaus Antiochus Epiphanes (38–92 AD)
- Gaius Julius Antiochus Epiphanes Philopappos (65–116)

== Others ==
- Antiochus (mythology), name of five figures in Greek mythology
- Antiochus of Alexandria, writer on Greek comedy
- Antiochus, an epigrammatic poet, one of whose epigrams is extant in the Greek Anthology
- Antiochus of Laodicea, a sceptic philosopher, and a disciple of Zeuxis; see Laodicea on the Lycus
- Antiochus (sculptor), a sculptor of ancient Greece from Athens
- Antiochus of Syracuse (c. 423 BC), Greek historian
- Antiochus (admiral), Athenian admiral of Alcibiades (407 BC)
- Antiochus of Arcadia, Greek envoy to Persia (4th century BC)
- Antiochus of Antioch, villainous king in Apollonius of Tyre legend
- Antiochus, villainous king in Shakespeare's Pericles, Prince of Tyre
- Antiochus of Ascalon (c. 130–68 BC), philosopher, member of Plato's Academy
- Antiochus of Sulcis (died 110), Christian martyr from Sardinia
- Antiochus of Athens (c. 100 CE), philosopher and astrologer
- Antiochus Philometor (c. 2nd century CE), ancient physician
- Antiochus (physician) (c. 2nd century CE), ancient physician, different from above
- Publius Anteius Antiochus (c. 200 CE), otherwise known as Antiochus of Aegae, a sophist or Cynic philosopher
- Septimius Antiochus (died 273), last Palmyrene Emperor (273)
- Antiochus (praepositus sacri cubiculi), Byzantine courtier and imperial tutor
- Antiochus bishop of Ptolemais, 5th century bishop
- Antiochus Chuzon, 5th-century politician of the Byzantine Empire
- Antiochus of Palestine, 7th-century monk
- Antiochos (strategos of Sicily), Byzantine governor of Sicily

== Fictional ==
- Antiochus 'Tony' Wilson, protagonist of Seconds (1966 film)
- Antiochus, the leader of a fictional religious sect found in the Deathconsciousness booklet.

== See also ==
- Antiochis, female version of the name
- Antiochianus, a surname
- Antiochia (disambiguation)
