= Antiochia =

Antiochia or Antiocheia or Antiochea or Antiokheia may refer to any of several Hellenistic cities in the Near East which were founded or rebuilt by the several rulers named Antiochus during the Seleucid Empire:

== In modern Turkey ==
- Antioch (Antiochia ad Orontem, Syrian Antiochia or Great Antiochia), modern Antakya
  - Principality of Antiochia, a Crusader state centered on it
- Nisibis or Antiochia Mygdonia, in ancient Mesopotamia, now Nusaybin, Mardin Province
- Antioch of Pisidia (also Antiochia in Phrygia), near modern Yalvaç, Isparta Province
- Aydın, also known as Antiochia, Tralles or Tralleis, modern Aydın, Turkey
- Alabanda or Antiochia of the Chrysaorians, Caria, modern Doğanyurt (formerly Araphisar), Aydin Province
- Antioch on the Maeander (Antiochia ad Mæandrum), in Caria, formerly Pythopolis, ruins near Kuyucak, Aydin Province
- Antiochia (Lydia), precise location unknown
- Samosata or Antiochia in Commagene, now Samsat, Adıyaman Province
- Cebrene or Antiochia in Troad, Kevrin or Kebrene, now in Canakkale Province, Turkey
- Edessa, Mesopotamia or Antiochia on the Callirhoe, former capital of Osroene, later named Justinopolis and Edessa, now Şanlıurfa
- Tarsus (city), Antiochia on the Cydnus, or Tarsos, Mersin Province
- Antiochia Lamotis (Antiochia in Isauria), now near Erdemli, Mersin Province
- Antiochia ad Cragum (Antiochetta, Antiocheta, or Latin: Antiochia Parva), now Güney, Antalya Province
- Antiochia ad Euphratem, submerged site in Gaziantep Province
- Antiochia ad Pyramum, ruins near Karataş, Adana Province
- Adana (Antiochia in Cilicia), now Adana, Adana Province
- Antiochia ad Taurum, in Cilicia later in Commagene, probably now Gaziantep (less probably, Aleppo, Syria)
- Antiochia Paraliou, location unknown but some identify it with Antiochia ad Cragum; probably in Turkey
- Antiochia in Mesopotamia, also Antiochia in Arabia and Antiochia Arabis, and Constantia, now near Viranşehir, Şanlıurfa Province, Turkey

== In modern Iran ==
- Nahavand or Antiochia in Persis, also Antiochia in Media and Antiochia of Chosroes, later Laodicea in Media, now Nahavand
- Bushehr, previously also “Antiochia in Persis”

== In modern Iraq ==
- Charax (Tigris) or Antiochia in Susiana, later Charax, near the confluence of the Tigris and the Choaspes rivers
- Antiochia in Sittacene, in ancient Sittacene, between the Tigris and Tornadotus

== In modern Israel ==
- Hippos, Antiochia Hippos or Antiochia ad Hippum, in the Decapolis
- Antiochia Ptolemais, now Acre, Israel or Akko

== In modern Jordan ==
- Umm Qais or Antiochia Semiramis, also called Gadara, now Umm Qais

== In modern Syria ==
- Antiochia in Pieria, now Arwad

== In modern Turkmenistan and Uzbekistan ==
- Antiochia in Margiana, now Merv, Turkmenistan
- Antiochia in Scythia, on the Jaxartes (Syr Darya) river, now probably in Uzbekistan

== In Colombia ==
The Antioquia Department of Colombia is considered to have been named either after the well-known Antioch or after a less well-known city of that name.
