= Antiochis =

Ancient Greek feminine given name

The name Antiochis (Ancient Greek: Ἀντιoχίς) is the female name of Antiochus.

== Women ==
=== Seleucid Princesses & Hellenistic Queen Consorts ===
- Antiochis I, a daughter of Achaeus and granddaughter of Seleucus I Nicator. She married Attalus and became the mother of Attalus I, King of Pergamon
- Antiochis, a sister of Antiochus III the Great, being a daughter of Seleucus II Callinicus and Laodice II. She married Xerxes of Armenia, King of Arsamosata, a city between the Euphrates and the Tigris
- Antiochis, a daughter of Antiochus III the Great and Laodice III. She married Ariarathes IV of Cappadocia, and had one daughter and two sons by him
- Antiochis, concubine of Antiochus IV Epiphanes. The cities of Tarsus and Mallus were given to her as a gift and the citizens of the cities revolted. Antiochus crushed the rebellion
- Antiochis of Commagene, a daughter of Antiochus I Theos of Commagene

=== Physician ===
- Antiochis of Tlos in Lycia, a 1st-century physician daughter of Diodotus (perhaps Diodotus the physician)

== Athenian clan (phyle) ==
- Antiochis (tribe), an Athenian phyle, was named Antiochis after Antiochus a mythical Attic hero. Aristides "the Just" the son of Lysimachus, was of the tribe of Antiochis. For the subdivisions-townships of Antiochis in Attica, see deme.

== See also ==
- Antiochianus
