= Fabulla =

Medical writer of the Roman Empire

Fabulla or Fabylla (fl. before AD 210) was a medical writer of the Roman Empire, whose work survives only as two quotations in Galen.

== Identity ==
Galen calls Fabulla a Libyan, but her name identifies her as Roman. She uses a Roman weight system (including the libra) to measure her ingredients, and this suggests that her work may have been written originally in Latin, and translated into Greek by Galen or a lost intermediary source. She was probably a medica ('female doctor').

== Works ==
Galen references two medicines from Fabulla, 'for those with disease of the spleen, dropsy, sciatica, gout', and shortly thereafter reproduces a Greek text of the recipes. Fabulla herself attributes the first of these medicines to an earlier medica, Antiochis of Tlos.

== Sources ==
- Flemming, Rebecca (2007). "Women, Writing and Medicine in the Classical World". The Classical Quarterly, 57(1): pp. 257–279.
- Parker, Holt N. (2012). "Galen and the Girls: Sources for Women Medical Writers Revisited". The Classical Quarterly, 62(1): pp. 359–386.
- Plant, Ian Michael (2004). Women Writers of Ancient Greece and Rome: An Anthology. London: Equinox Publishing Ltd. pp. 5, 139, 159, 223, 243.
