= Antiochus (physician) =

Antiochus (Ancient Greek: Ἀντίοχος) was a physician of ancient Greece who appears to have lived at Rome in the 2nd century AD. The ancient physician Galen gives a precise account of the food he used to eat and the way in which he lived, and tells us that by paying attention to his diet he was able to dispense with the use of medicines, and when upwards of eighty years old used to visit his patients on foot. Byzantine Greek medical writer Aëtius of Amida and Paulus Aegineta quote a prescription which may perhaps belong to this physician, but he is probably not the person mentioned by Galen under the name "Antiochus Philometor".
