= Antiochianus =

Antiochianus is a surname. Notable people with the surname include:

- Antiochianus, last praetorian prefect of Elegabalus
- Flavius Antiochianus, prominent Roman politician who lived in the Crisis of the Third Century

== See also ==
- Antioch
- Antiochus (disambiguation)
- Antiochis
