= Cultural Heritage Center =

The Cultural Heritage Center of the American Bureau of Educational and Cultural Affairs specializes in the protection and preservation of the world's ancient and historic monuments and archeological sites.

== The International Cultural Property Protection initiative ==
The 1970 UNESCO Convention on the Means of Prohibiting and Preventing the Illicit Import, Export and Transfer of Ownership of Cultural Property provides a framework for cooperation among nations to reduce the incentive for pillage of archaeological and ethnological material. Stolen or illegally exported artifacts in the United States strains relations with the countries of origin. Restrictions on importation are intended to reduce the incentive for pillage by encouraging a legal trade in documented materials and discouraging trade in undocumented materials.

== Ambassadors Fund for Cultural Preservation ==
The Ambassadors Fund for Cultural Preservation provides direct grant support for the preservation of cultural sites, cultural objects, and collections, as well as forms of traditional cultural expressions, in countries around the world.

== Iraq Cultural Heritage Initiative ==
The United States works with Iraq to protect and preserve Iraq's past by engaging American institutional partners to collaborate with the Iraq State Board of Antiquities and Heritage. These include infrastructure upgrades at the National Museum of Iraq, site management planning and architectural conservation in Babylon, and training Iraqi professionals in the conservation of objects, sites, and monuments at a specialized institute in Erbil.

== Cultural Heritage Center Projects ==
- Ghazni Towers Documentation Project
- Support for the Cultural Heritage of Afghanistan
- ICOM Red Lists of Antiquities at Risk

The Central supports UNESCO's Database of National Cultural Heritage Laws.
