= Umm Qais =

Umm Qais أم قيس Gadara
- Town
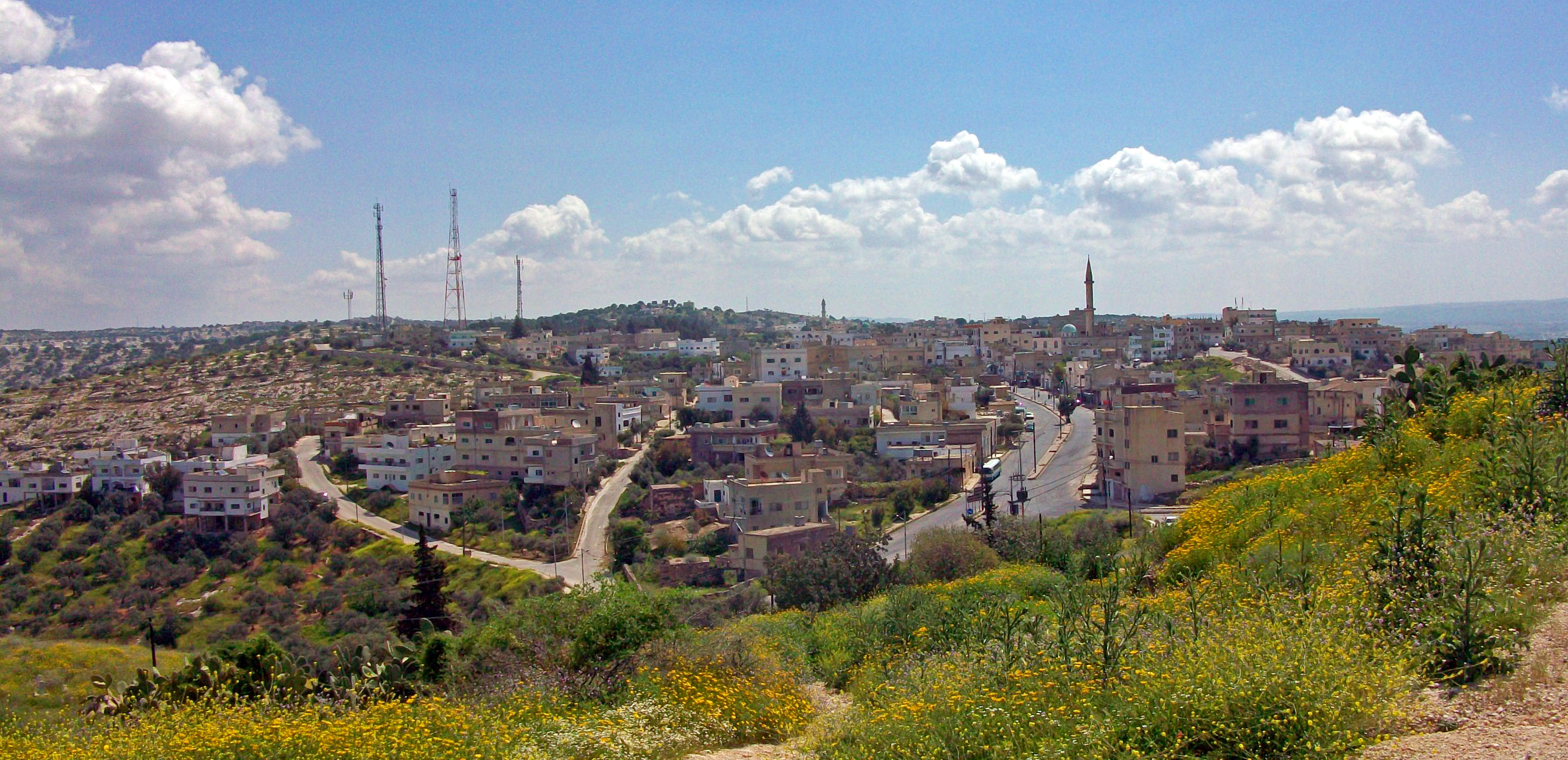
- Umm Qais from north

- Location in Jordan
- Coordinates: 32°39′15″N 35°41′15″E
- PAL: 213/228
- Country: Jordan
- Governorate: Irbid
- Department: Bani Kinanah
- Elevation: 1,240 ft (378 m)
- Time zone: UTC+2 (UTC+2)
  - Summer (DST): UTC+3 (UTC+3)
- Area code: +(962)2

Umm Qais (Arabic: أم قيس, lit. 'Mother of Qais'), also known as Qays, is a town in northern Jordan principally known for its proximity to the ruins of the ancient Gadara. It is the largest city in the Bani Kinanah Department and Irbid Governorate in the extreme northwest of the country, near Jordan's borders with Israel and Syria. Today, the site is divided into three main areas: the archaeological site (Gadara), the traditional village (Umm Qais), and the modern town of Umm Qais.

== Location ==
Umm Qais is located 28 km north of Irbid and 120 km north of Amman. It expanded from the ruins of ancient Gadara, which are located on a ridge 378 metres (1,240 ft) above sea level, overlooking the Sea of Tiberias, the Golan Heights, and the Yarmouk River gorge. Strategically central and located close to multiple water sources, Umm Qais has historically attracted a high level of interest.

== History ==
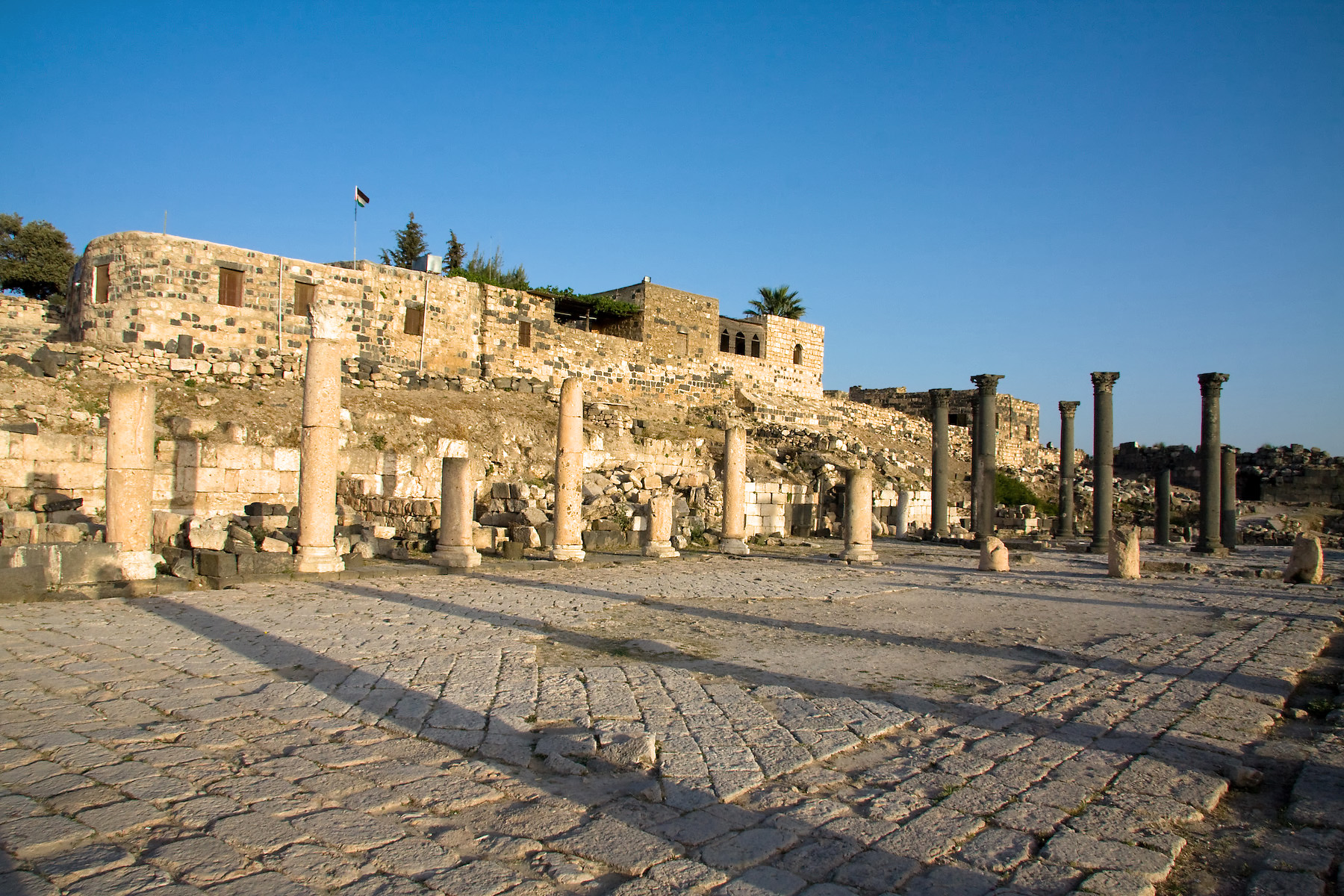
Church terrace at ancient Gadara

=== Antiquity ===
Gadara was a centre of Greek culture in the region during the Hellenistic and Roman periods.

The oldest archaeological evidence at Umm Qais, extends back to the second half of the third century BC. and the site appears to have been founded as a military colony by Alexander the Great's Macedonian Greeks. However, the site's name "Gadara" is not Greek in origin, but rather a Greek version of a local Semitic name meaning "fortifications" or "the fortified city" suggesting the military colony was founded on a pre-existing fortified site.

Located on the boundary between Seleucid and Ptolemaic territory, the city was strategically important and was repeatedly the focus of military conquests throughout the succession of Syrian Wars between 274–188 BCE. The city's military importance during this period was noted by the Greek historian Polybius' describing it in 218 BCE as a fortress and "the strongest of all places in the region".

The Roman-Seleucid War (192–188 BCE) weakened Seleucid control over the region devolving autonomy in Palestine and trans-Jordan to the Hasmonean, Iturean and Nabatean kingdoms whose rivalries continued to make Gadara a strategically important city and the focus of continued conflict.

In 98 BCE the Hasmonean King Alexander Jannaeus subjected the city to a 10 month siege, wresting control of the city and the trade routes to the ports of the Eastern Mediterranean that passed through it from the Nabateans. The Nabatean response culminated in Nabatean King Obdas 1st' decisive victory over Jannaeus at the Battle of Gadara in 93 BCE.

In 63 BCE, Roman general Pompey conquered the region, Gadara was rebuilt and became a member of the semi-autonomous Roman Decapolis. 33 years later Augustus attached it to the Jewish kingdom of his ally, Herod. After King Herod's death in 4 BCE, Gadara became part of the Roman province of Syria.

To supply larger populations Gadara, and the neighbouring Decapolis cities of Adraa (Dera'a, Syria) and Abila (Qweilbeh, Jordan) undertook construction of a water supply system of 170 km of aqueduct tunnels connecting the cities to springs throughout southern Syria and an artificially constructed lake at Dille. Constructed between 90–210 CE the network of rock cut tunnels included 2,900 access shafts, and a single 106 km section represents one of the most significant hydro-engineering accomplishments of the ancient world. During the Severan period (193–235 CE) the city underwent a rapid expansion westwards and many of the large civic monuments still visible on the site today date to this period and attest to an increase in importance and prosperity. After the Christianisation of the Eastern Roman Empire, Gadara retained its important regional status and became for many years the seat of a Christian bishop.

=== Early Islamic period ===
The Battle of Yarmouk in 636 CE, a short distance from Gadara, brought the entire region under Arab-Muslim rule.

On 18 January 749 CE much of the city was destroyed by the Galilee earthquake. Whilst the city was extensively damaged, archaeological evidence of limited reconstruction, including conversion of the large five aisle basilica church into a mosque indicates the continued settlement of the site at least into the 11th century.

By the 13th century the site is noted in historic sources under the new name of "Mukais", a local term meaning border place or customs house and from which the modern name of Umm Qais gradually derived.

=== Ottoman period ===
In 1596 it appeared in the Ottoman tax registers named as Mkeis, situated in the nahiya (subdistrict) of Bani Kinana, part of the Hauran Sanjak. It had 21 households and 15 bachelors; all Muslim, in addition to 3 Christian households. The villagers paid a fixed tax-rate of 25% on agricultural products; including wheat, barley, summer crops, fruit trees, goats and bee-hives. The total tax was 8,500 akçe.

In 1806 Ulrich Jasper Seetzen visited Umm Qais and identified it as the location of ancient Gadara, describing the Ottoman settlement and the tombs and other monuments still visible on the surface. The ancient ruins at Um Keis were recorded again by western visitors in 1816 and 1838. By 1899 Schumacher, visiting the site as part of his survey work for the Hijaz railway records the village had expanded significantly with the construction of larger houses, noting also that many of the tombs recorded by early visitors were no longer present. Umm Qais's most impressive building, the Ottoman governor's residence known as Beit Rousan, "Rousan House", dates to this period of expansion in the Late Ottoman period.

=== Modern period ===
In 1920 the Madafa and Hosh (courtyard) of Hajj Mahmoud al Rousan's house in Umm Qais hosted a conference of Arab leaders from across the middle east to draw up a treaty in response to the British and French plan to divide the region following the end of the British and French Mandates.

The village's school was opened in 1922 by HRH King Abdullah I of Jordan making it the third oldest school in Jordan after those in Salt and Kerak.

By 1961 the population of Umm Qais was 1,196 inhabitants.

During the 1967 Arab-Israeli war Umm Qais' strategic location put it on the front line of conflict again. Heavy shelling from the Golan Heights and aircraft bombing damaged both the village and the ancient city. The underground Roman mausoleum below the five-aisled basilica in the west of the ancient was discovered by accident by the Jordanian army and the large intact underground chamber was used as a temporary field hospital during the conflict.

== Preservation efforts ==
In 1974 the German Protestant Institute of Archaeology uncovered the ruins of a Byzantine church building in Umm Qais.

Since 2005, the Orient Department of the German Archaeological Institute under the direction of Claudia Bührig has been active at Gadara. The team has uncovered Egyptian and Greek imported pottery, stamped amphorae, and a Seleucid fortress, among other things.

In 2015, the Ambassadors Fund for Cultural Preservation and Yarmouk University collaborated to better preserve the Roman Aqueduct of Gadara in Umm Qais. This project was completed in 2018, strengthening the largest remaining subterranean Roman aqueduct.

== Tourism ==
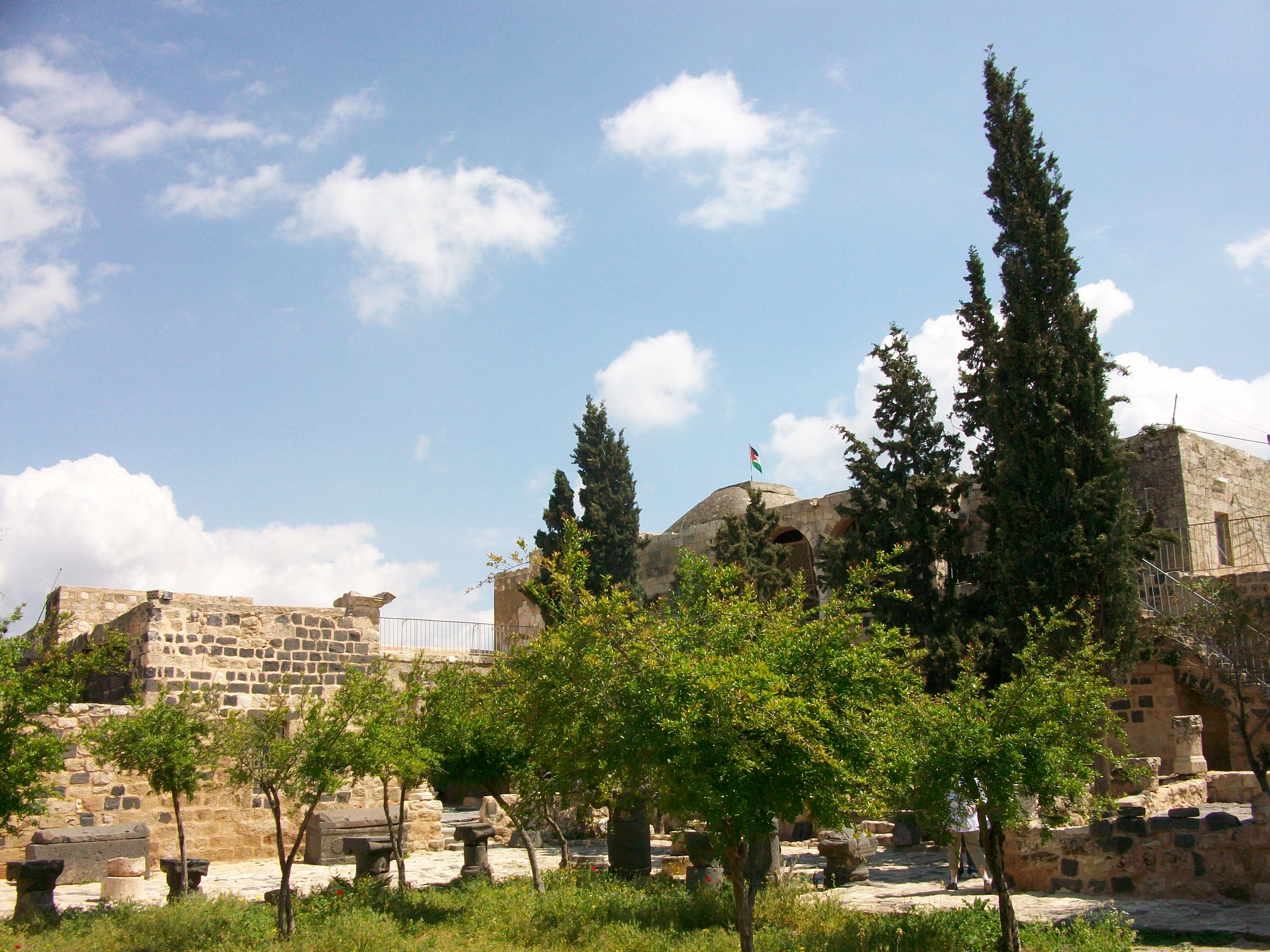
Beit Rousan

Many visitors come to Umm Qais on day trips from the capital, Amman, roughly 110 kilometres (68 mi) to the north, to see its extensive ruins and enjoy its panoramic views. The Sea of Galilee and Tiberias, Israel, are visible, and just across the valley of the Yarmouk River is the southern end of the Golan Heights, Syria, under Israeli occupation since the Six-Day War in 1967. Mount Hermon bordering Lebanon is visible in the distance on clear days.

At Beit Rousan, now housing a visitor Centre and a museum, Greek statues and Christian mosaics discovered during archaeological excavations of ancient Gadara are exhibited.

== See also ==
- Umm Qais Archaeological Museum

== Gallery ==
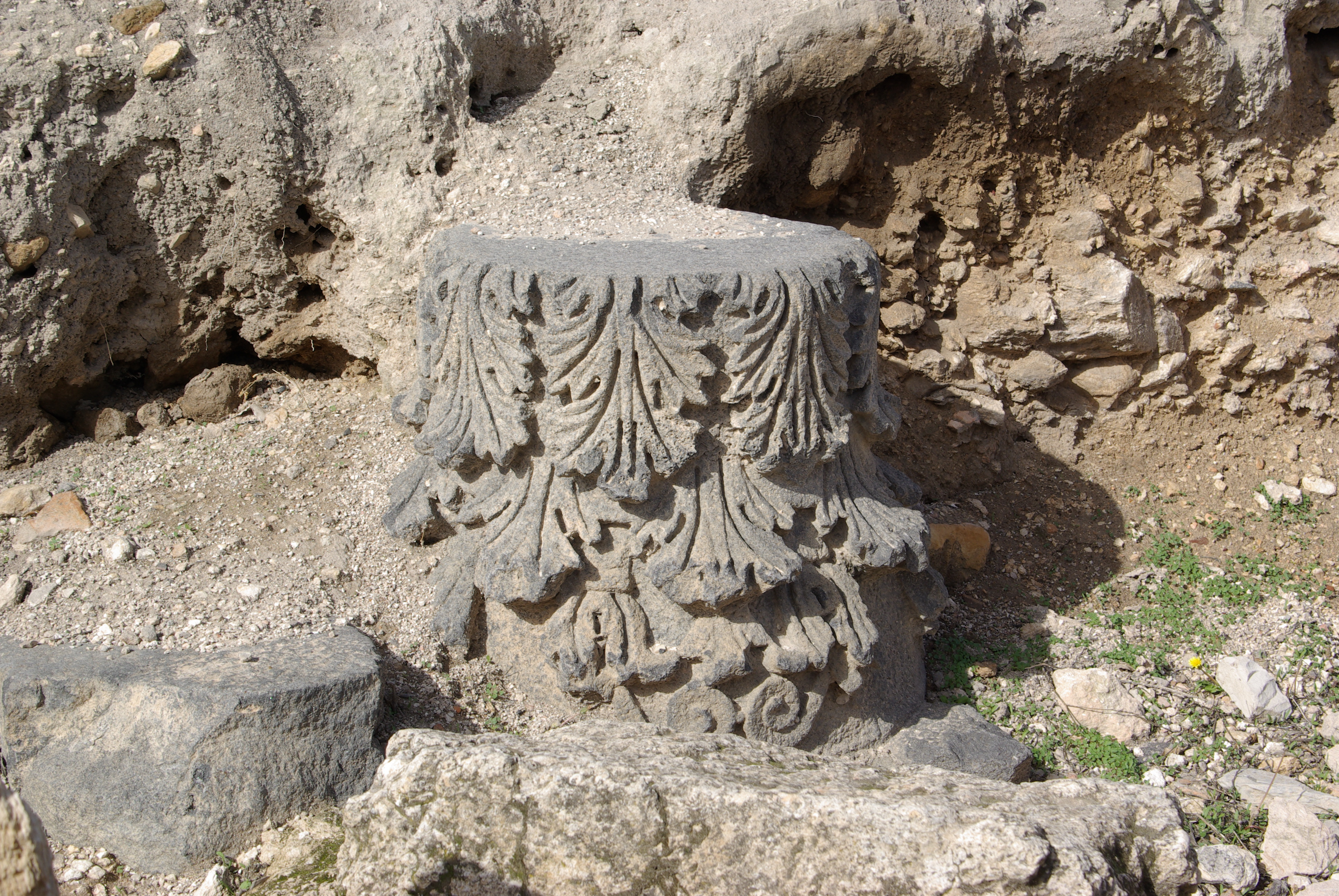

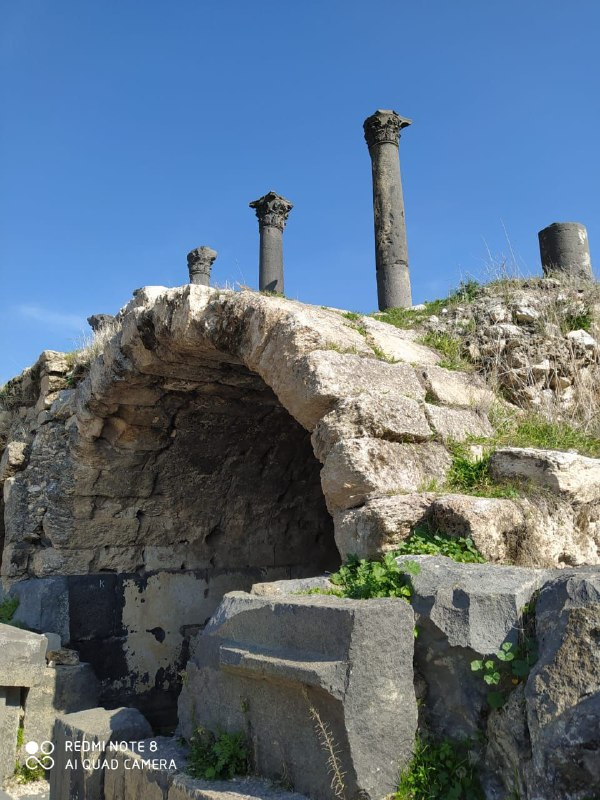

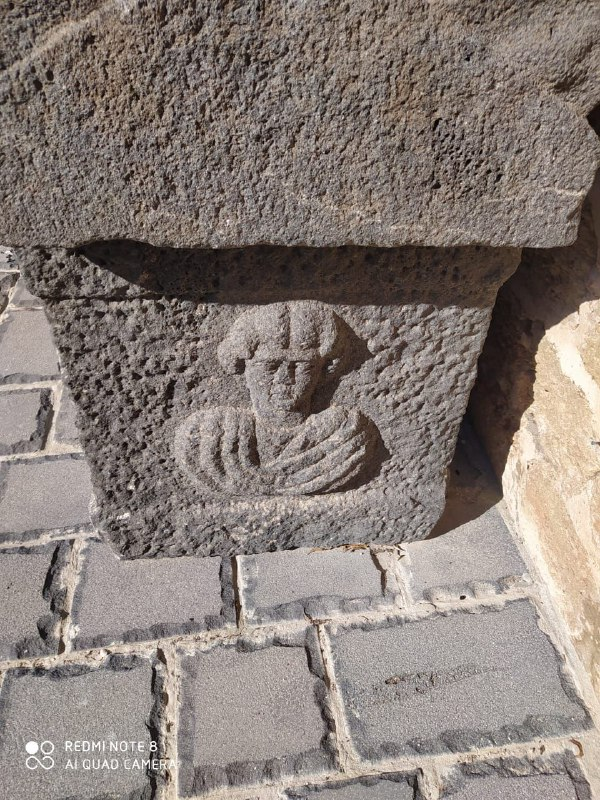

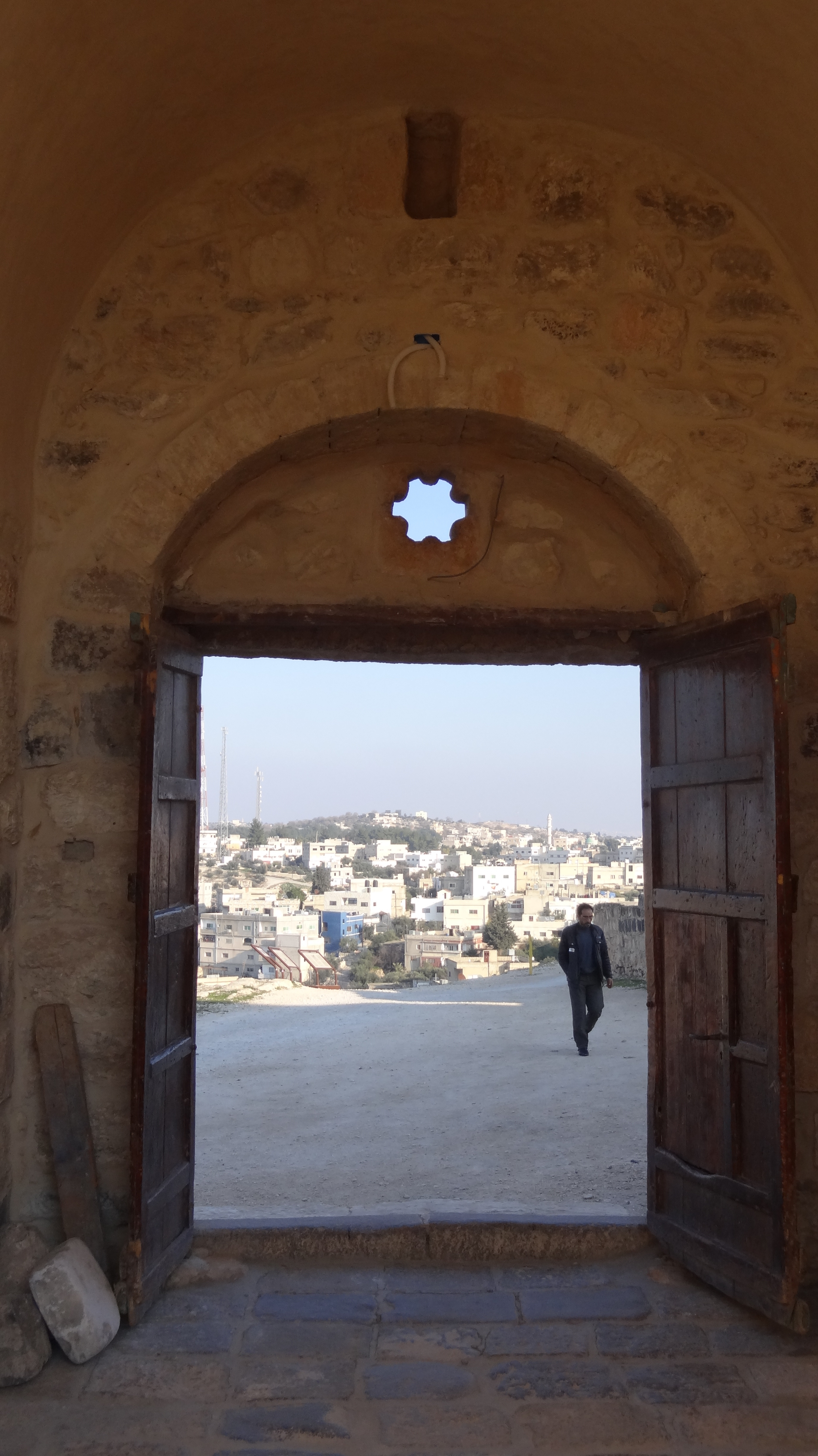

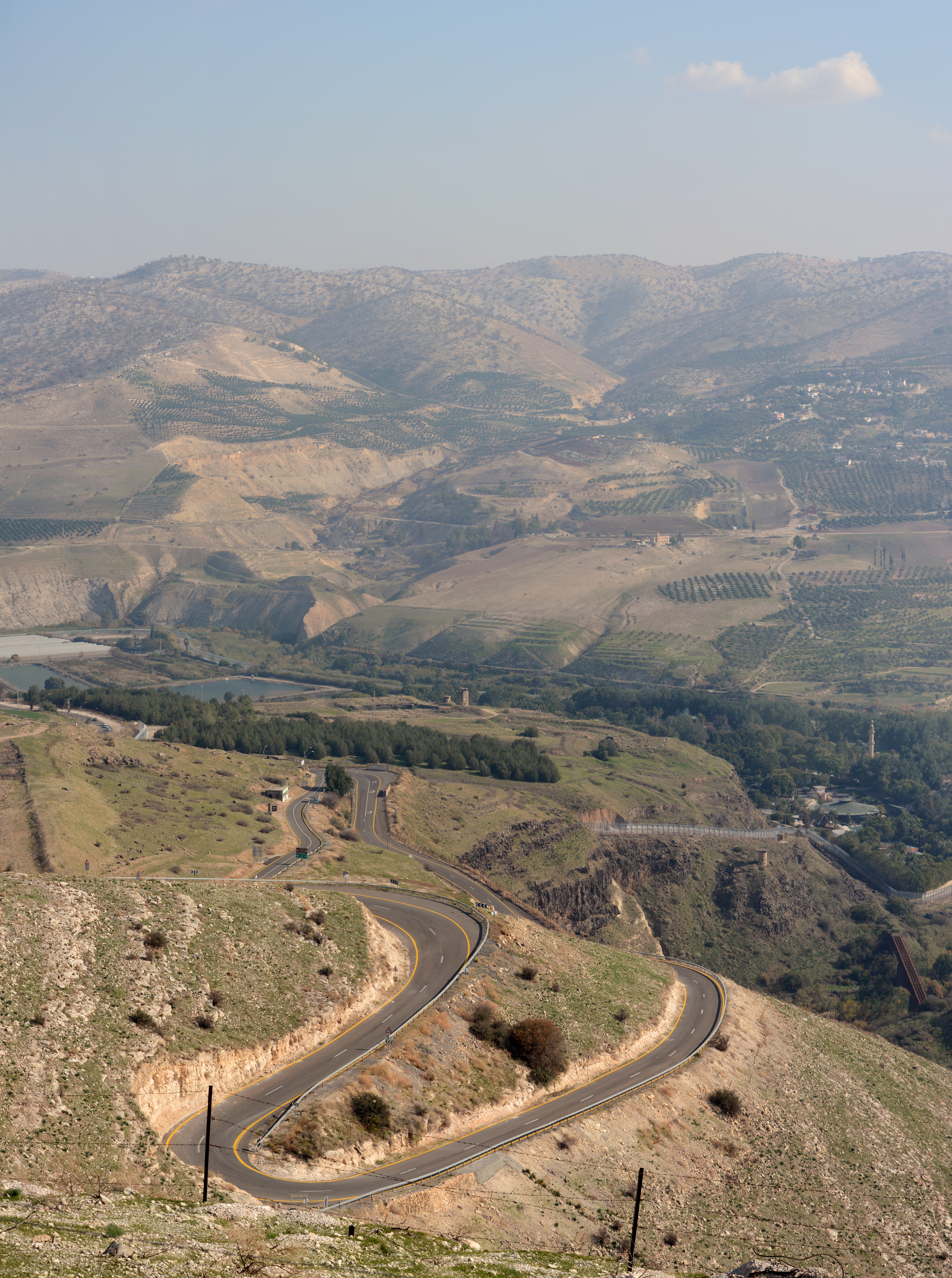

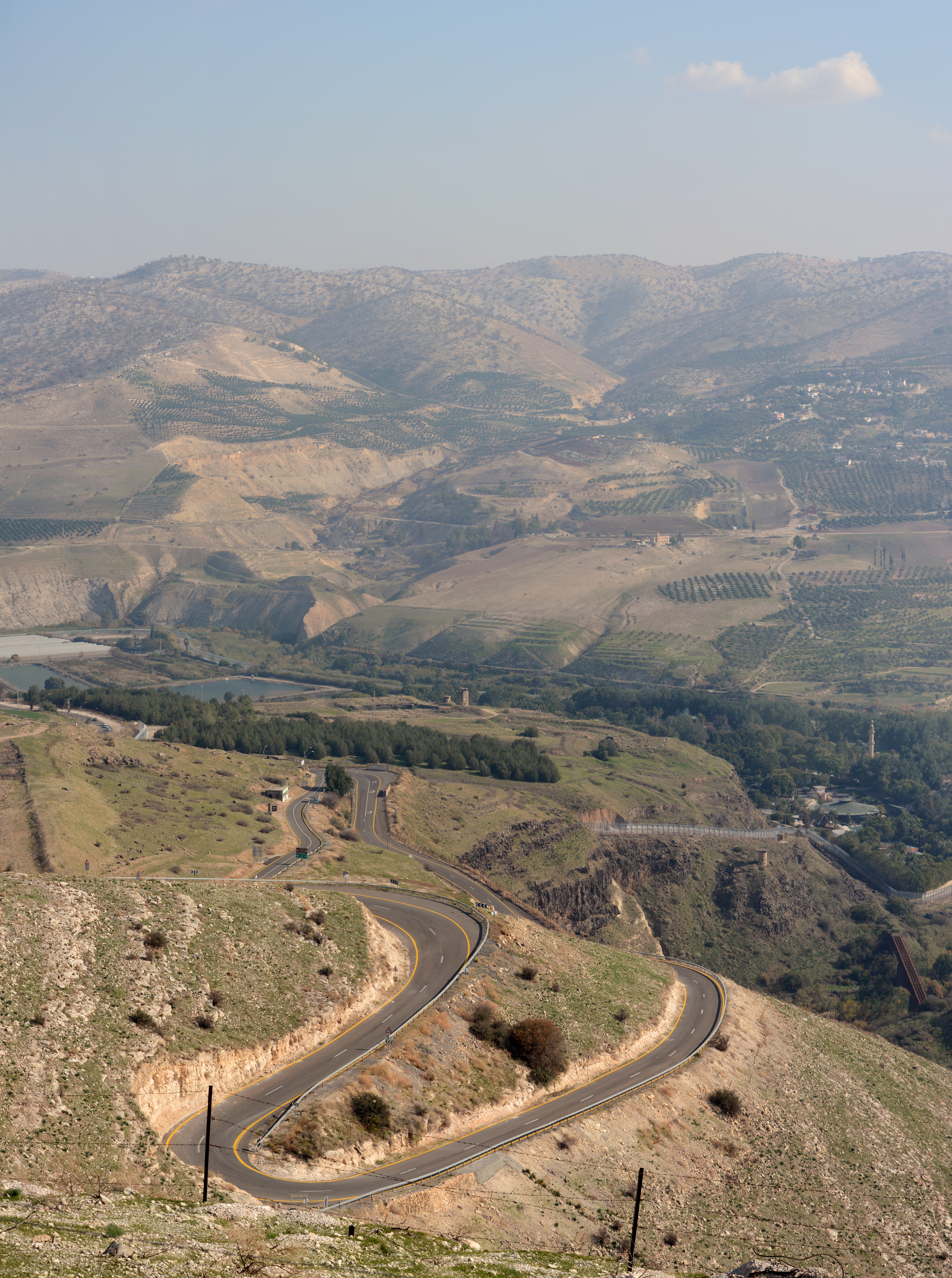

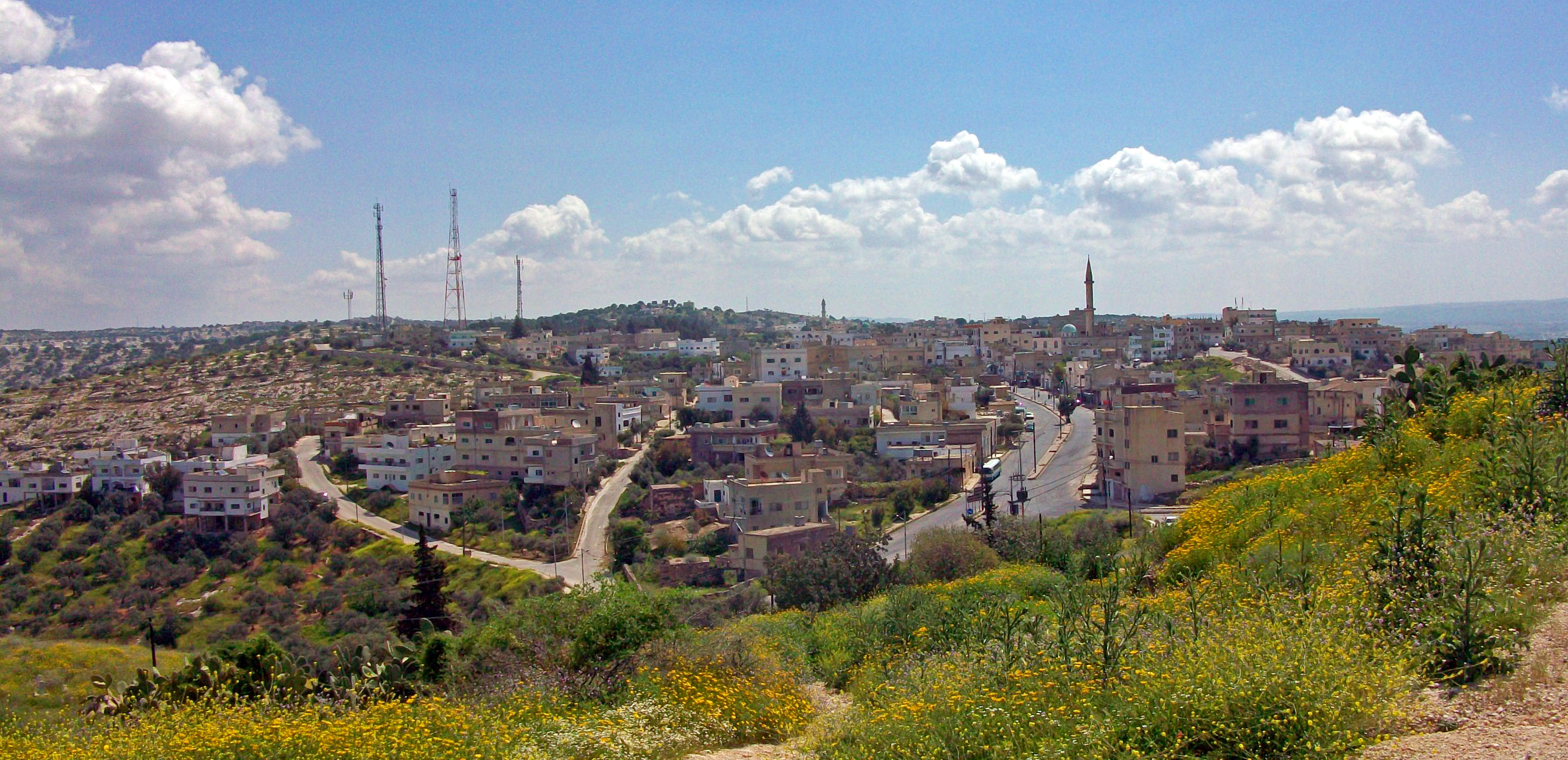

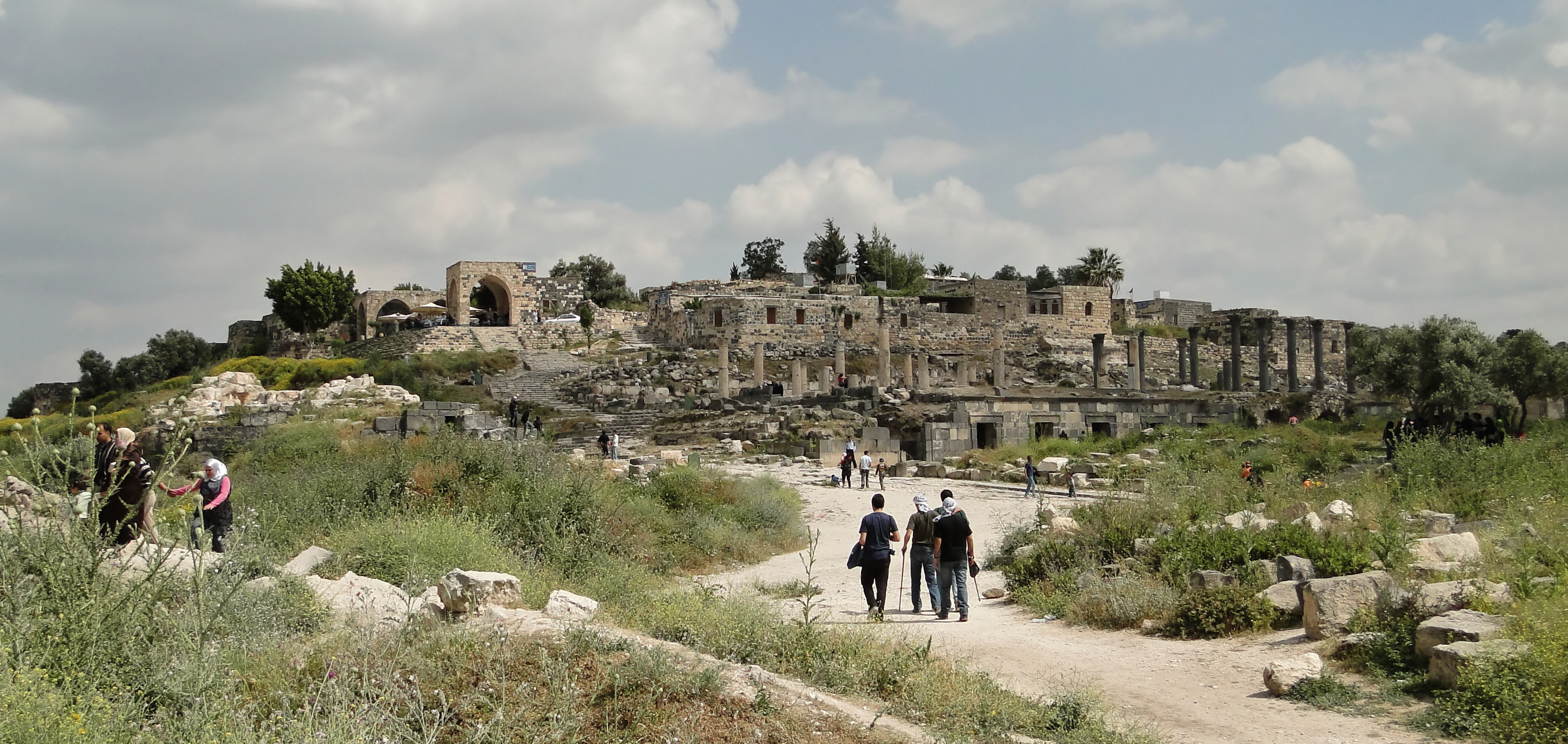

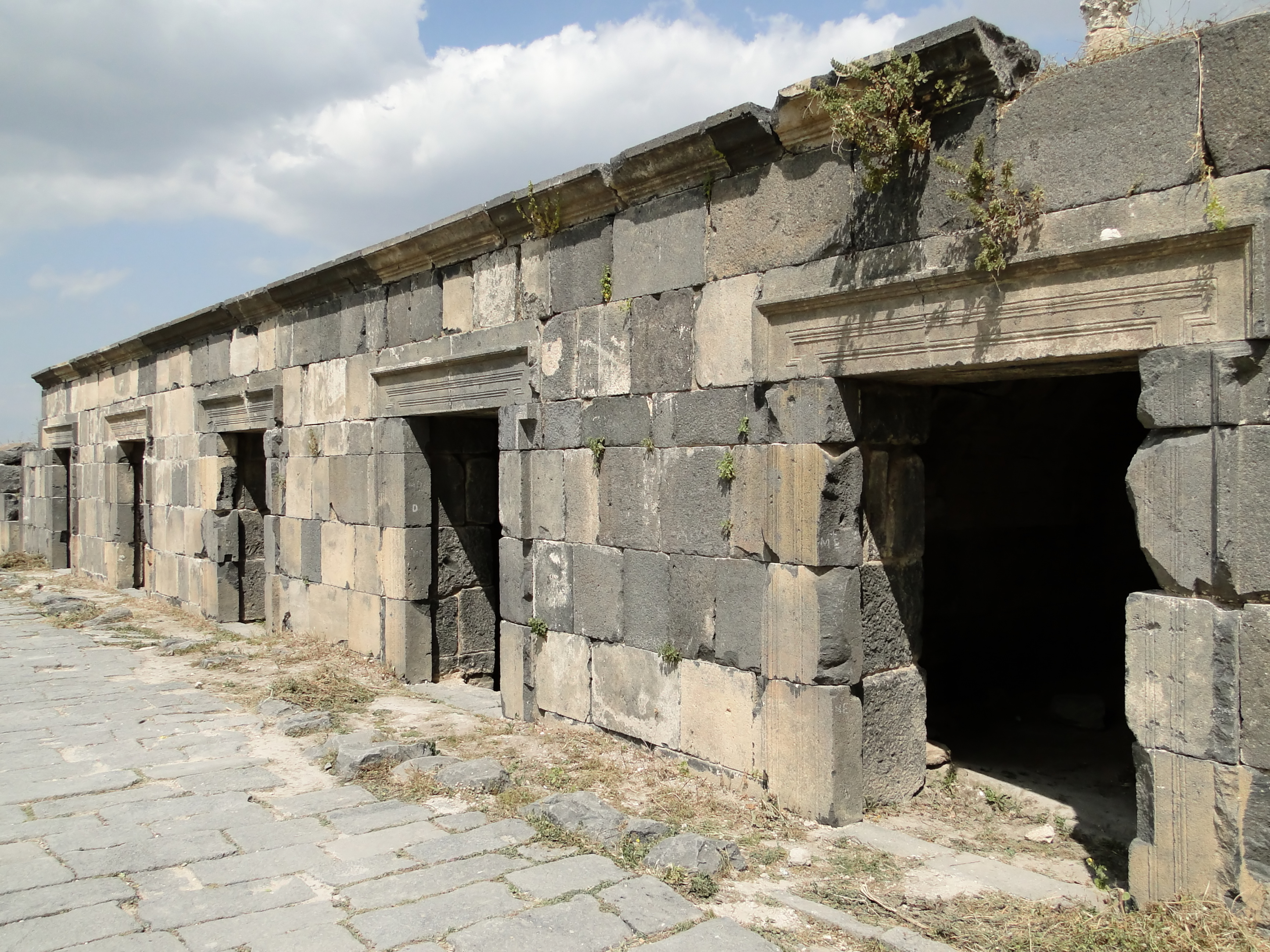

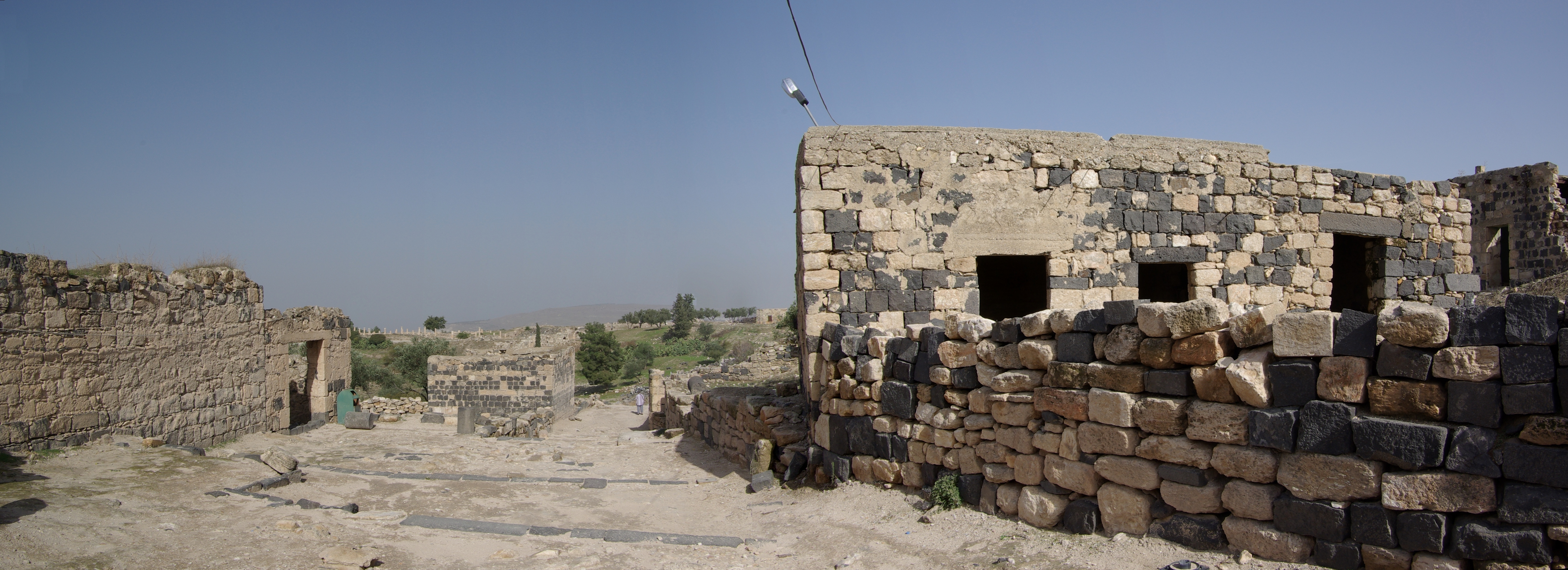

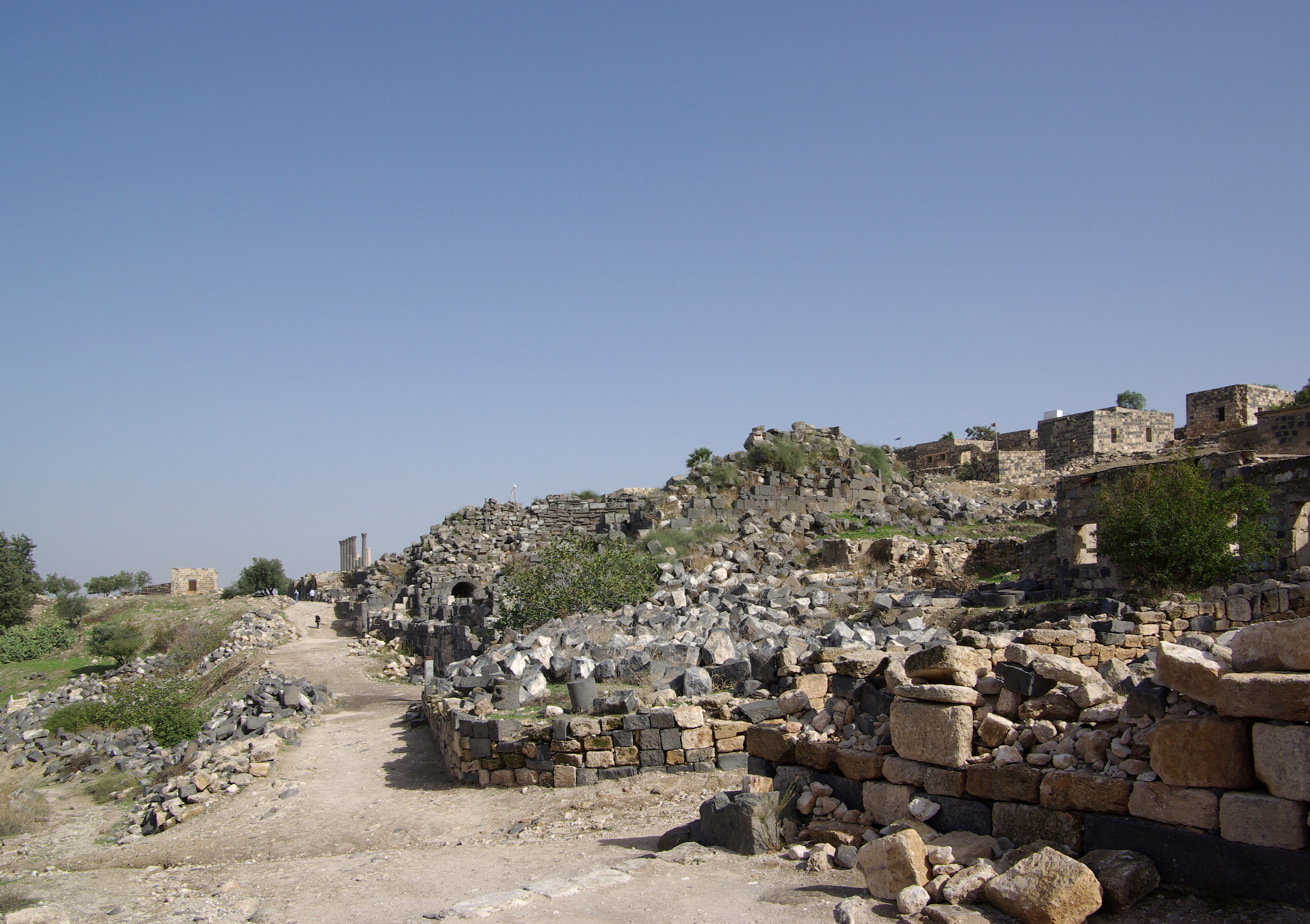

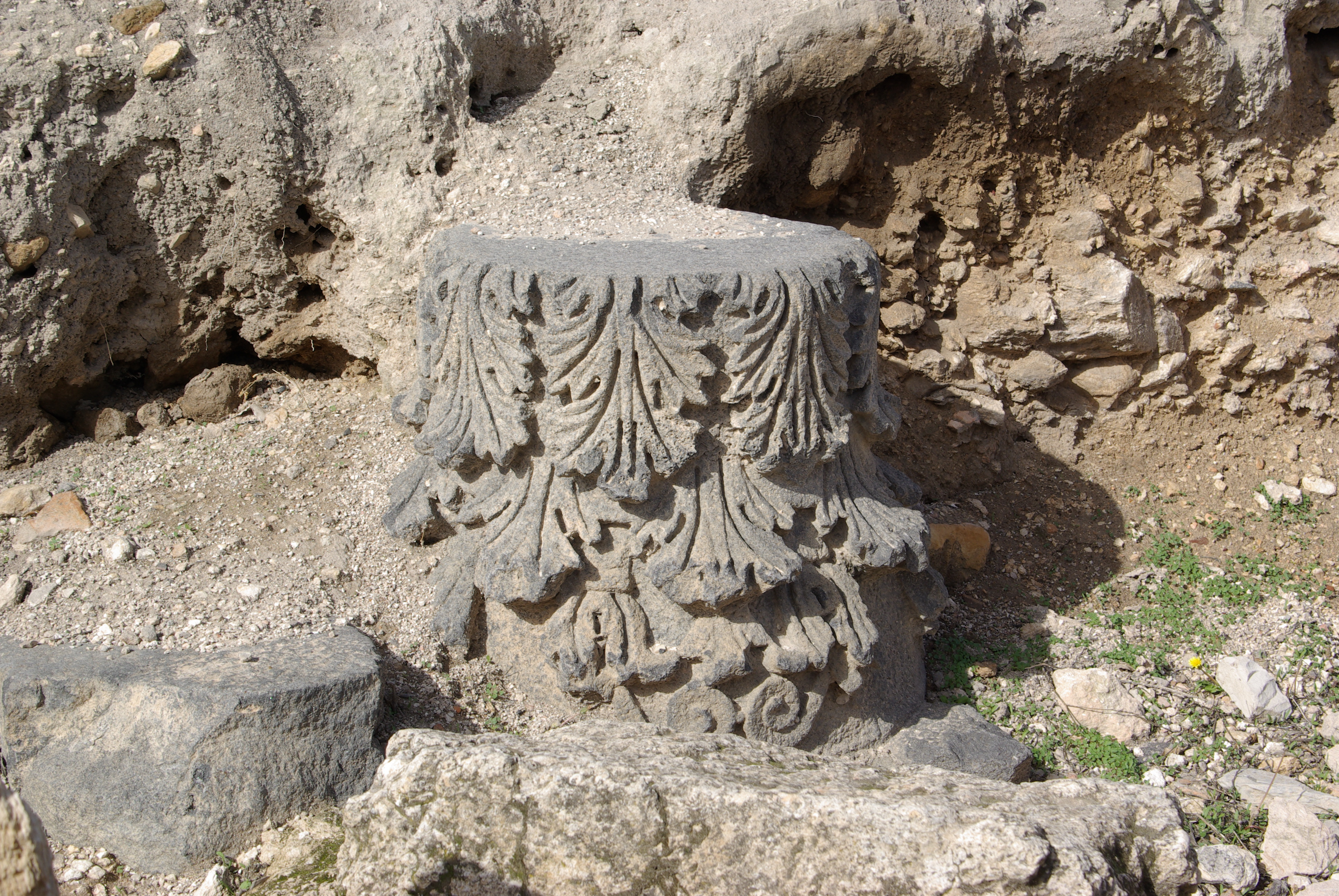

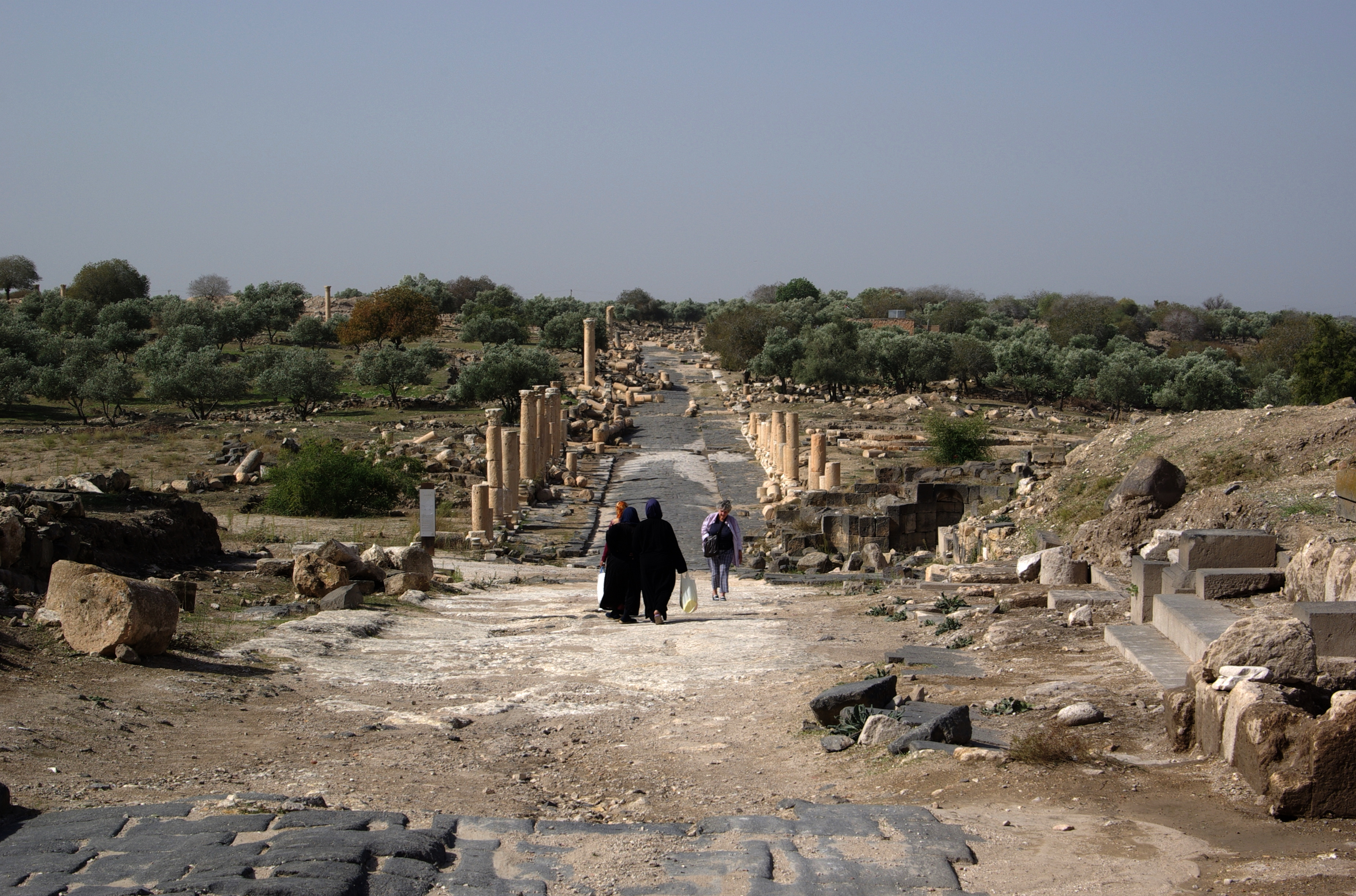

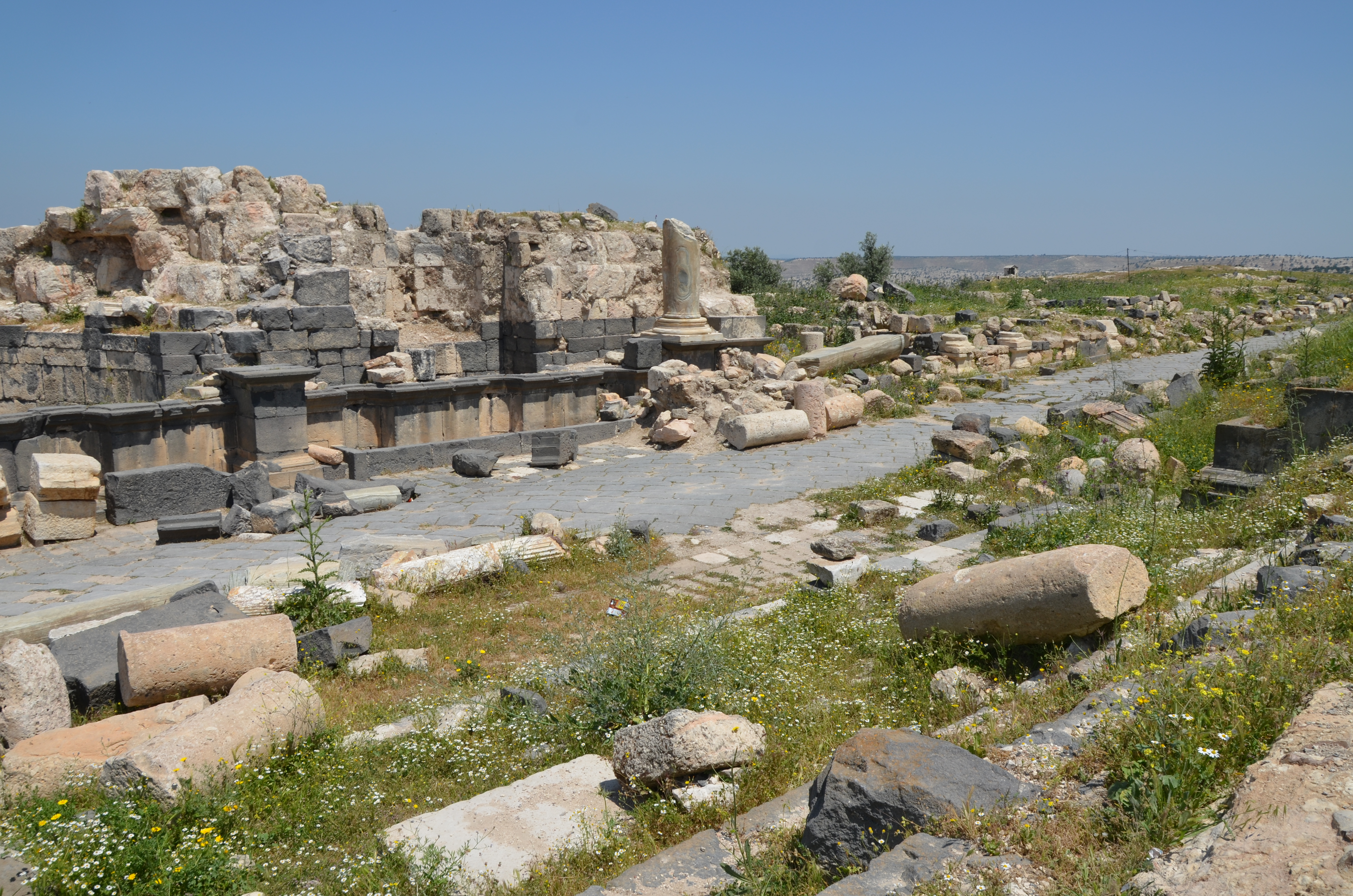

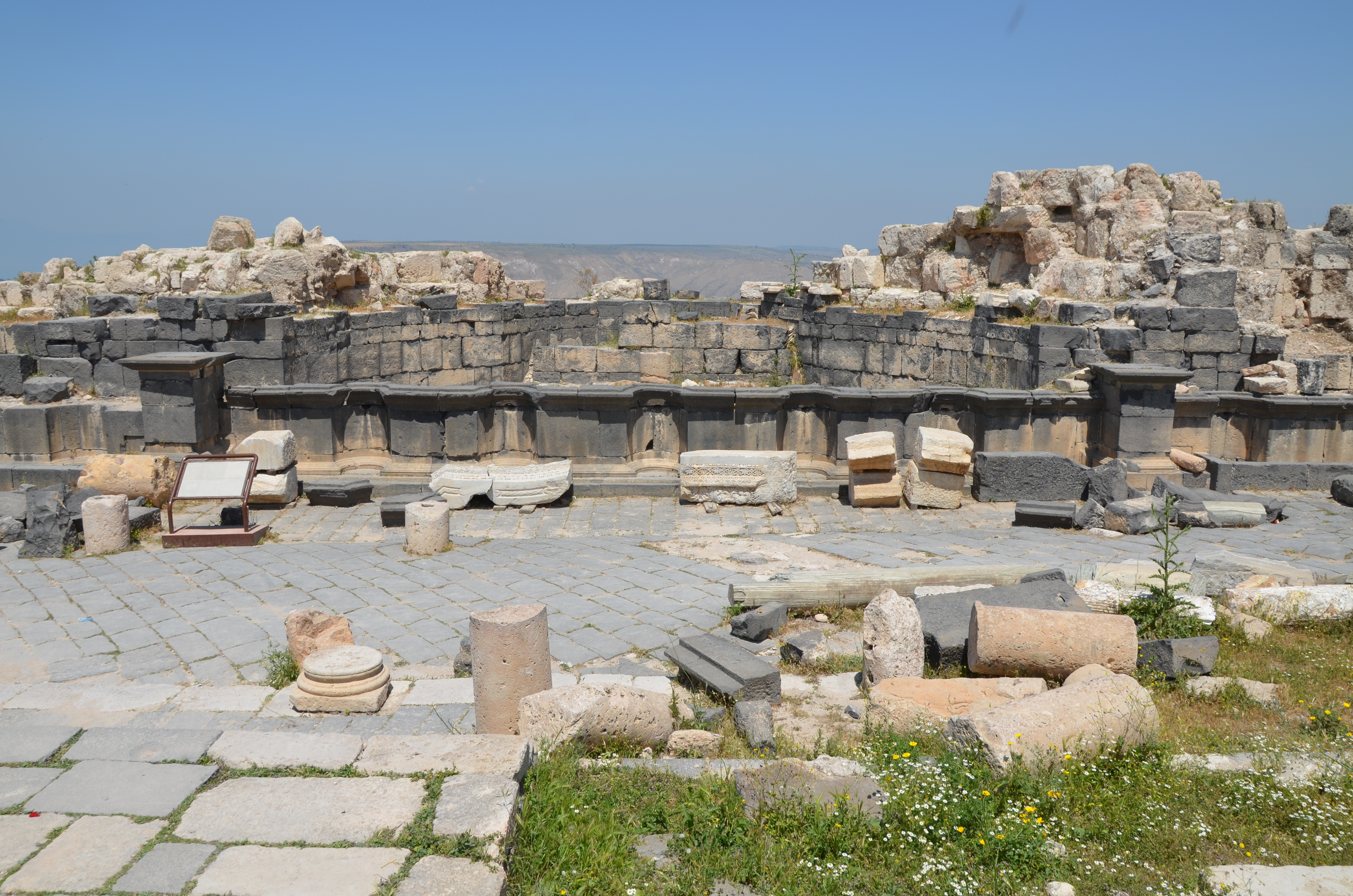

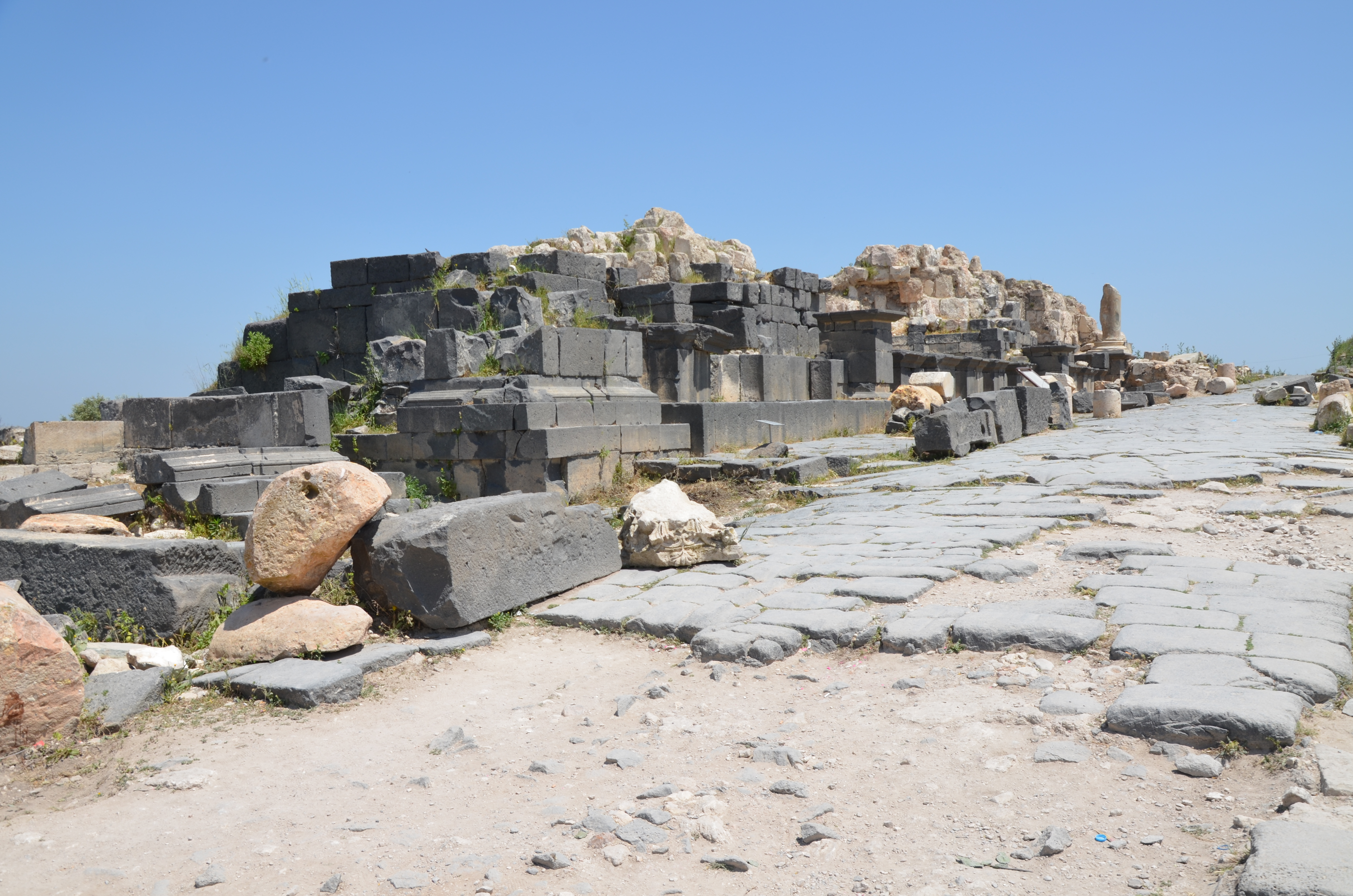

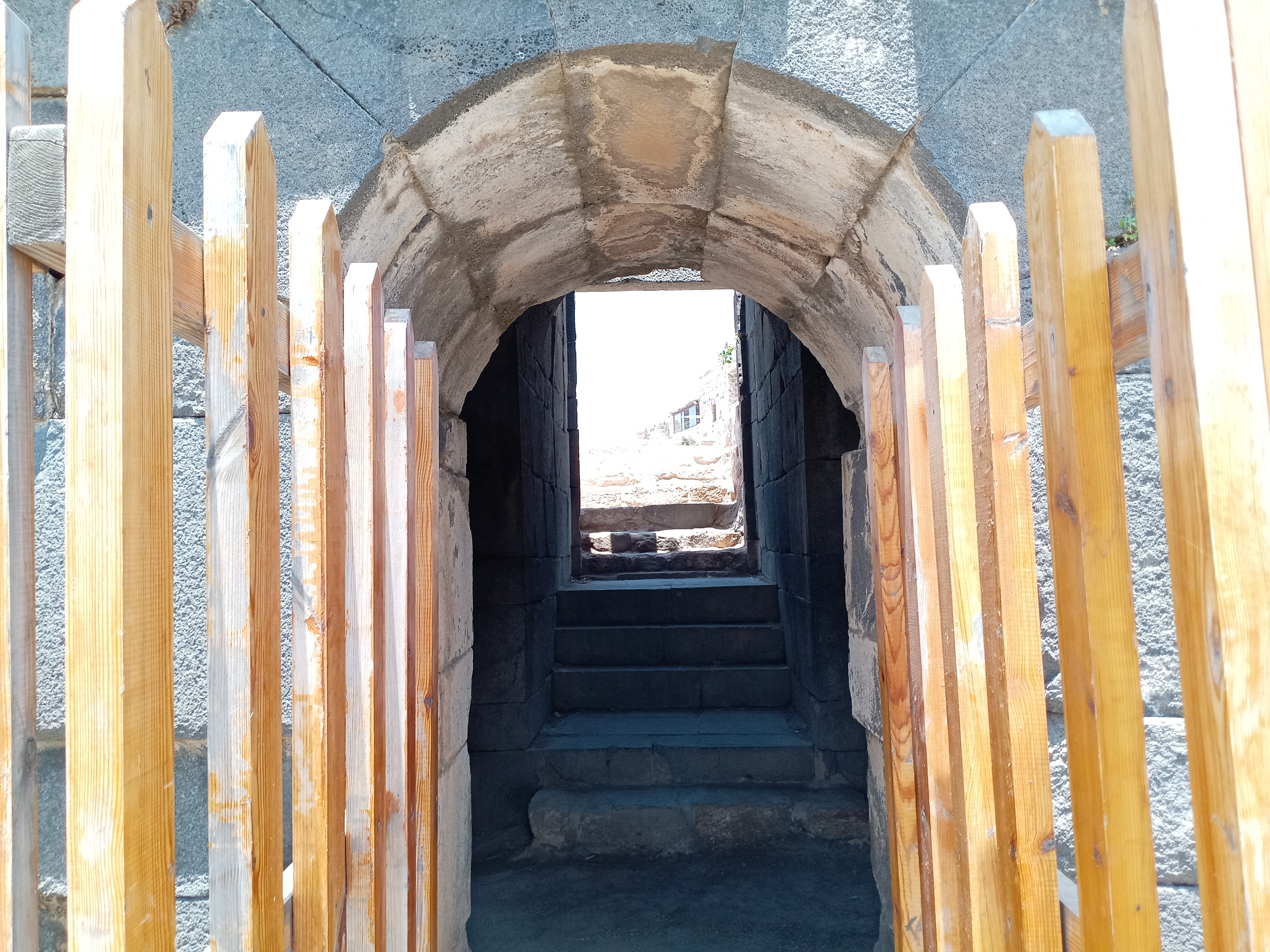

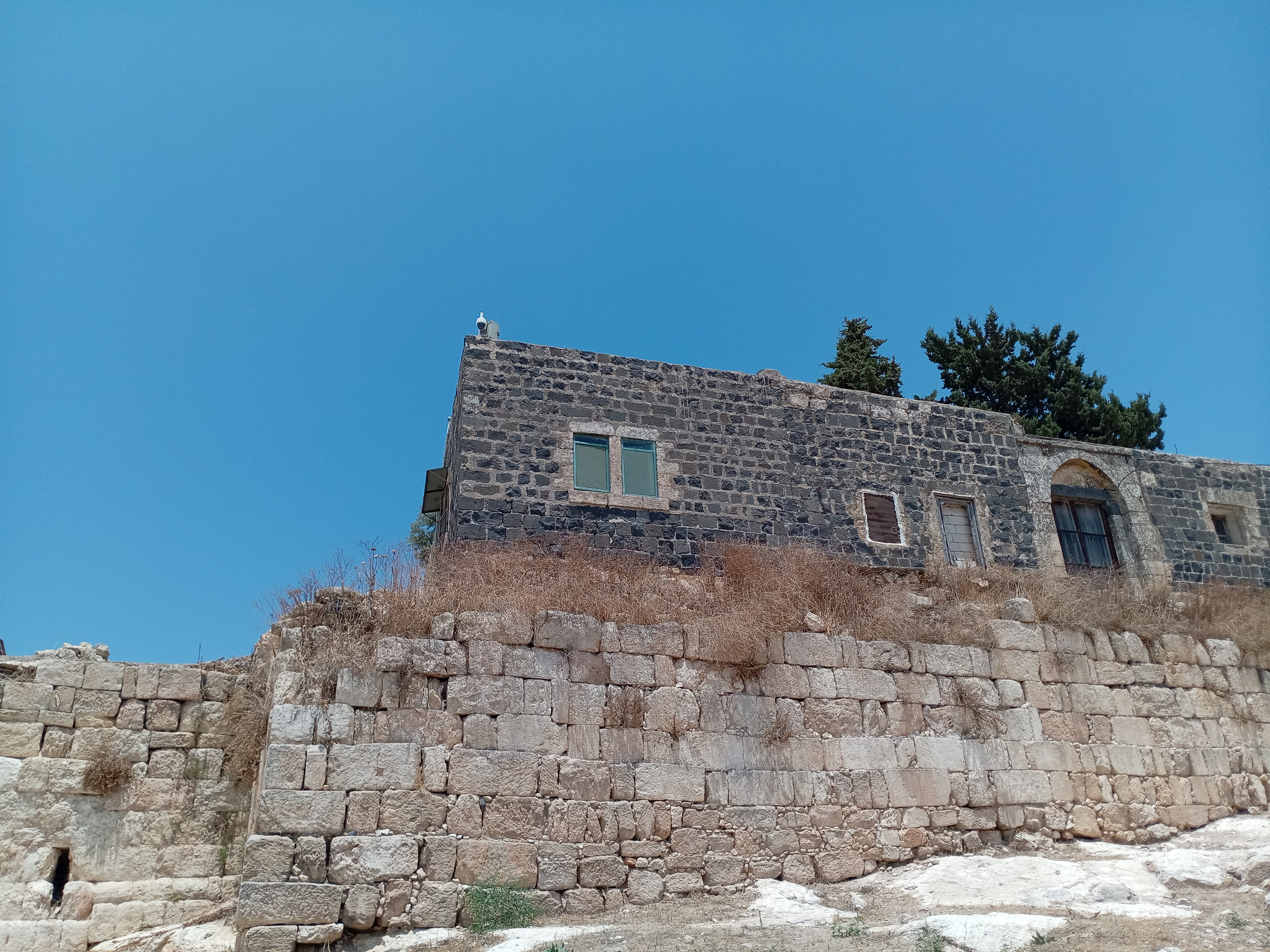

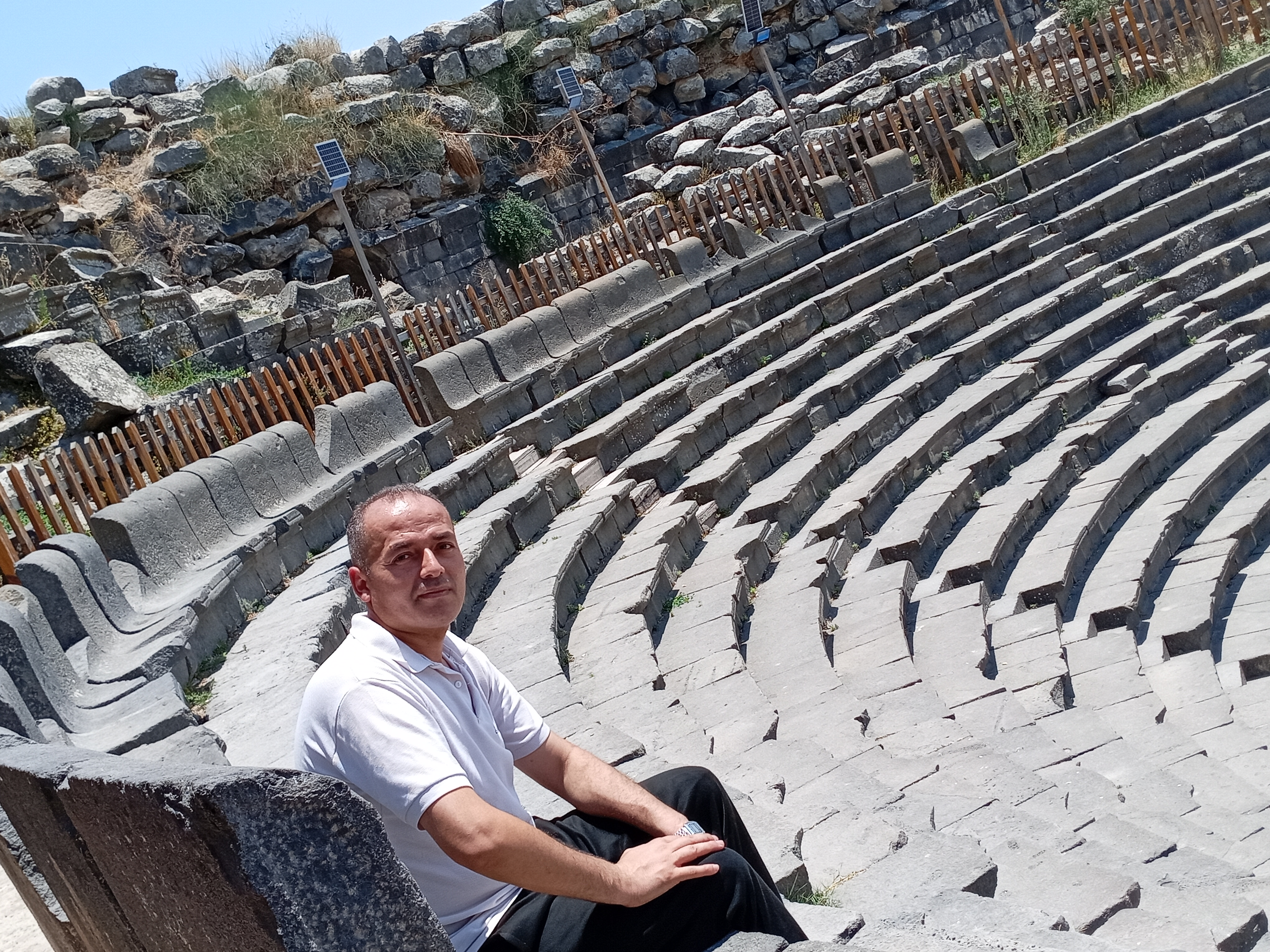

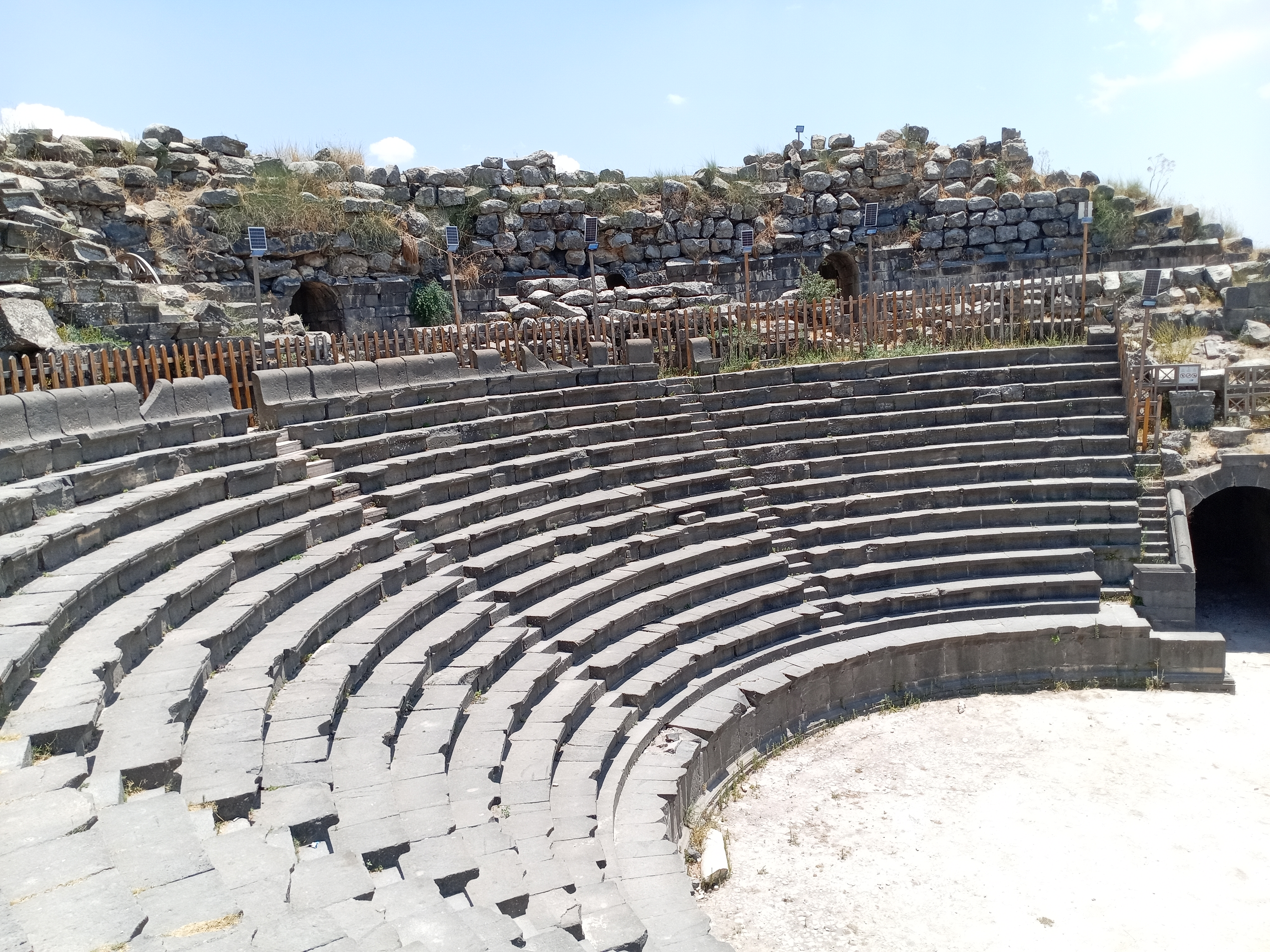

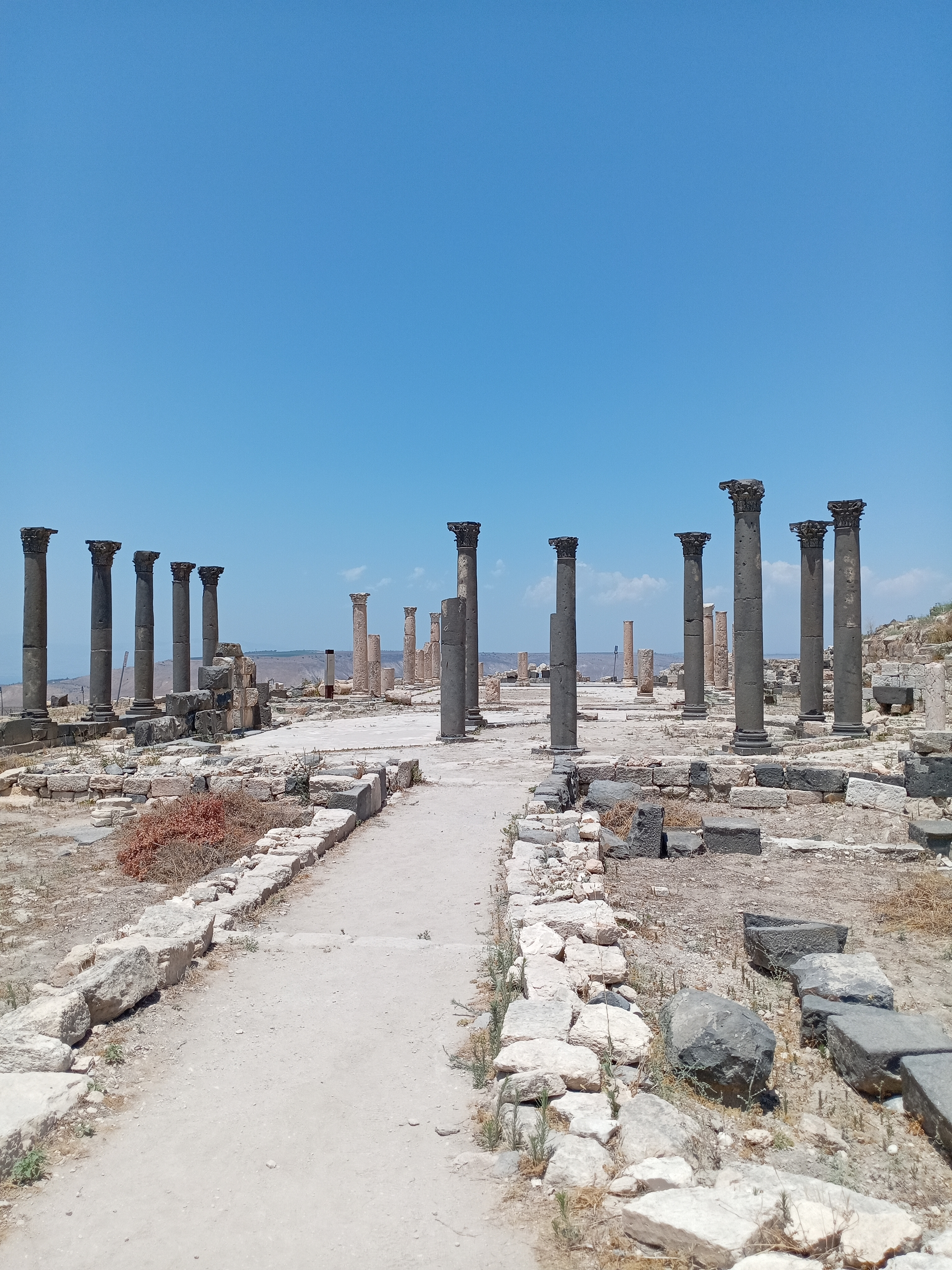

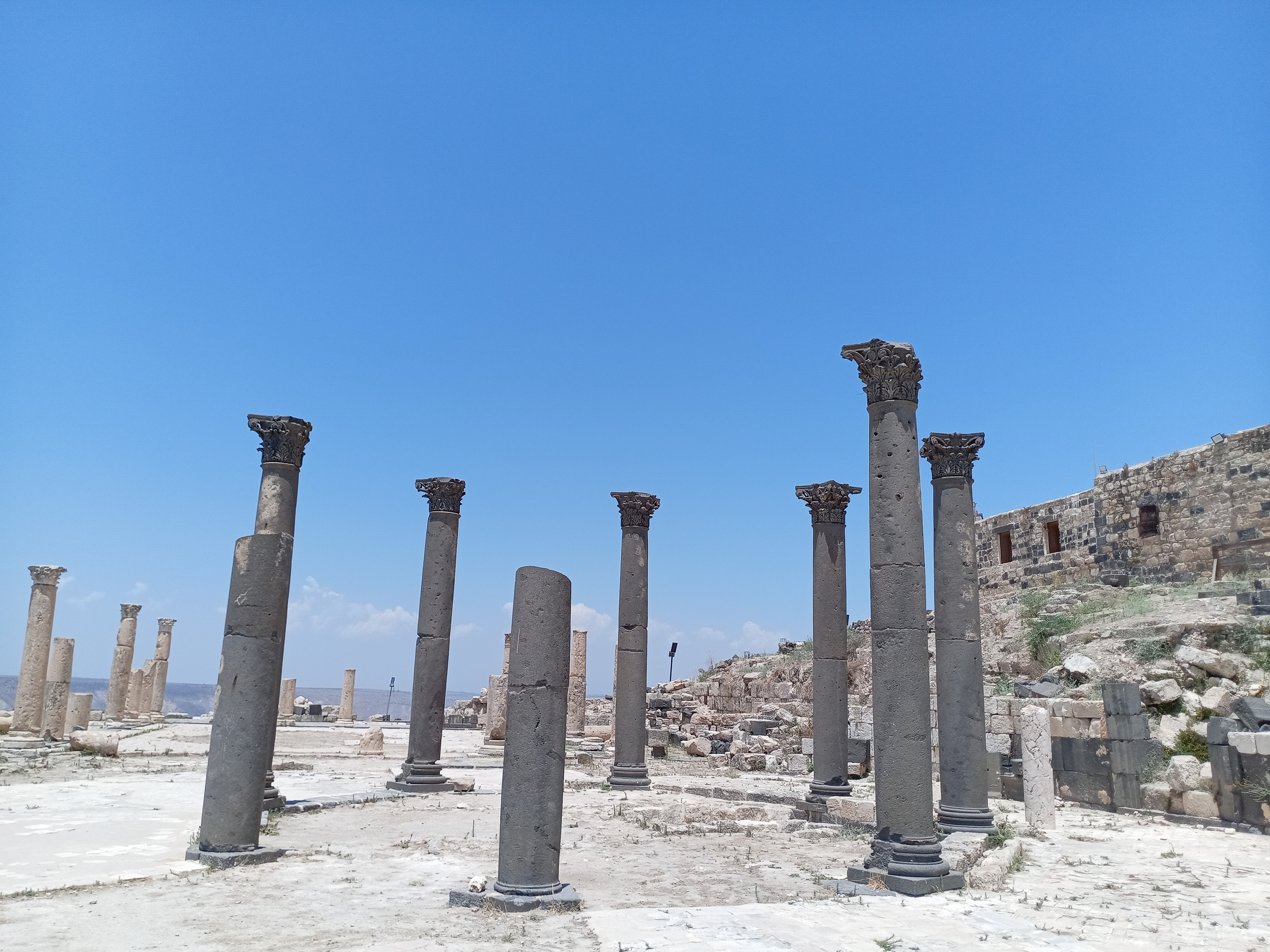

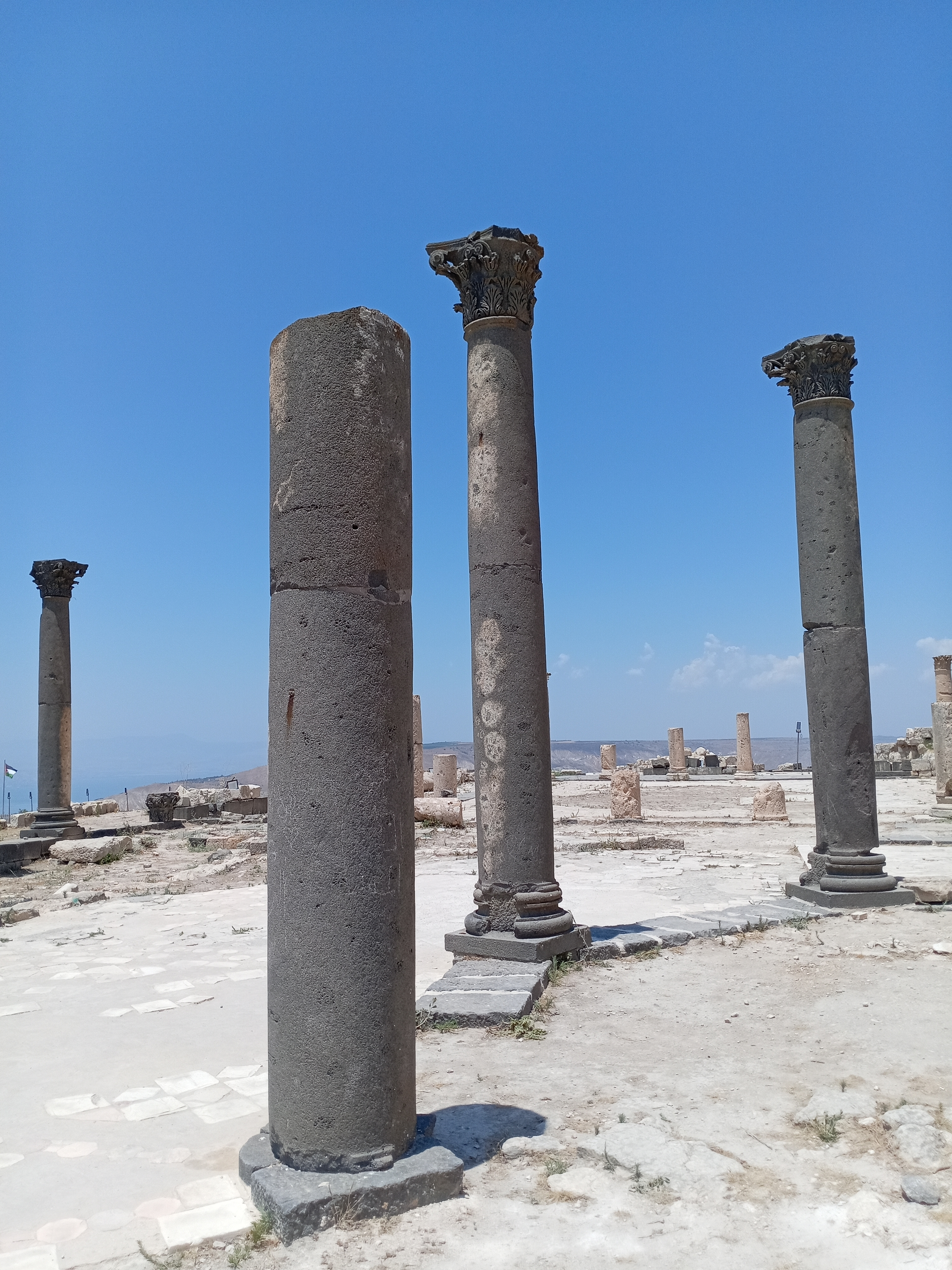

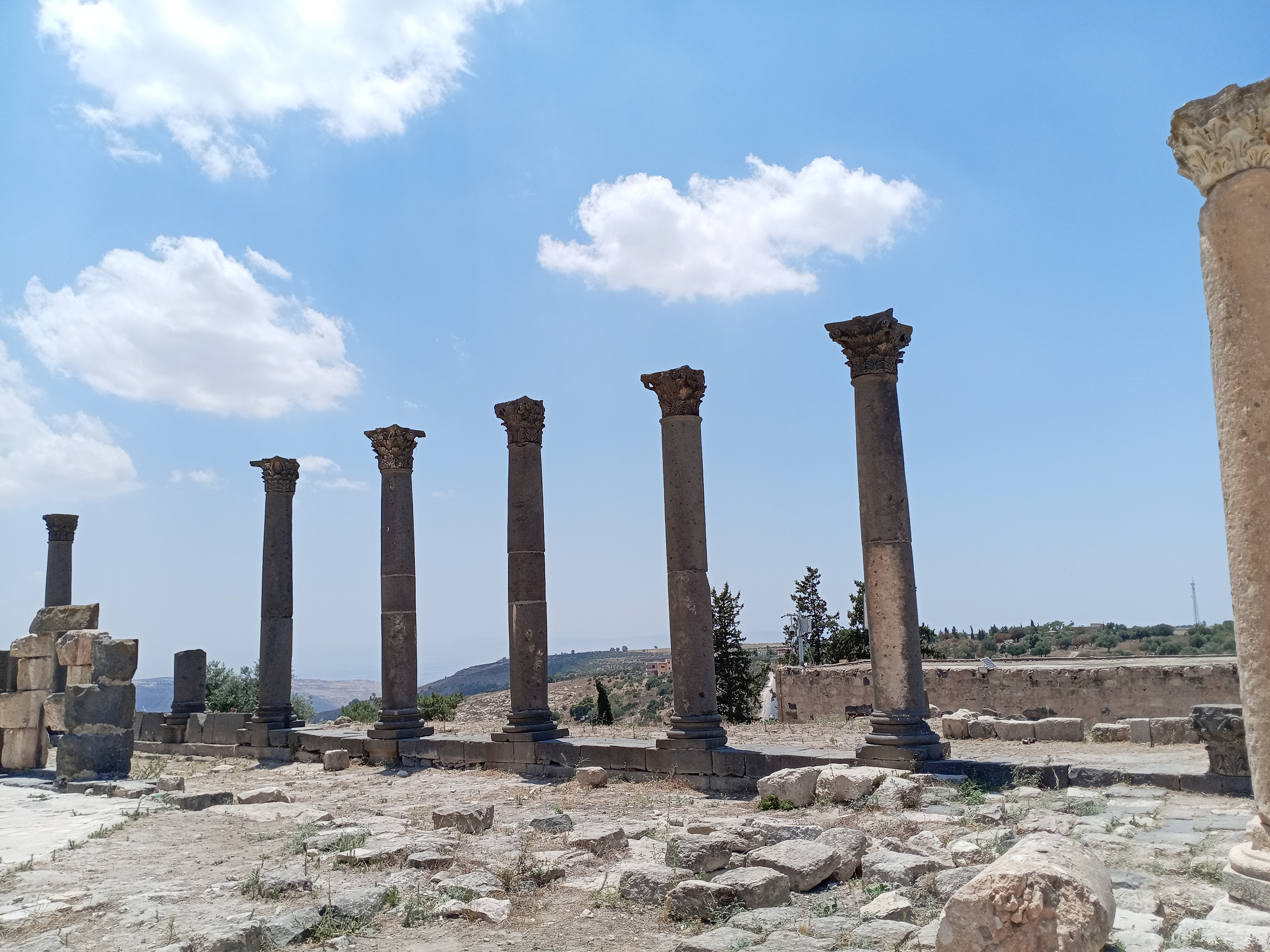

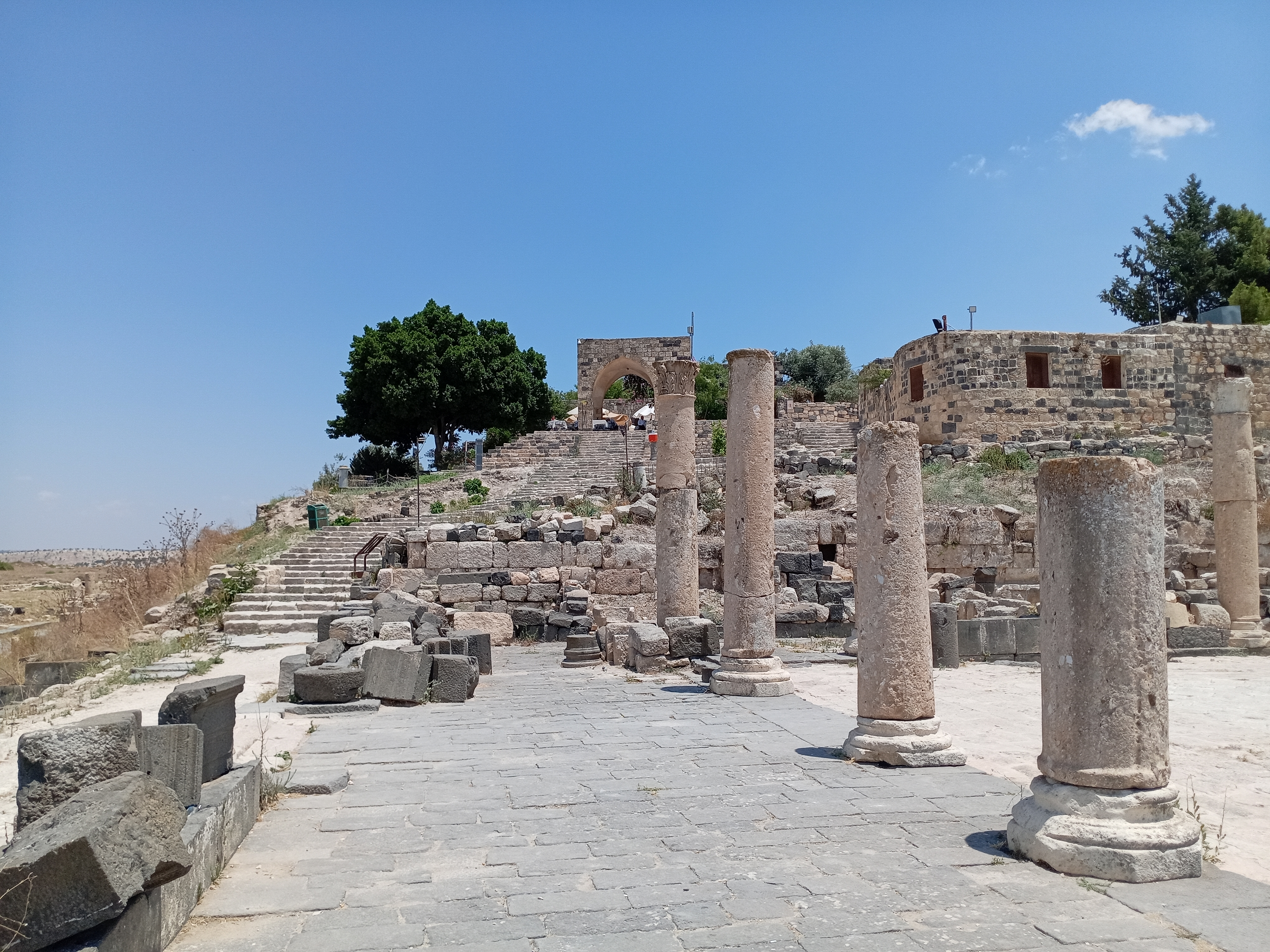

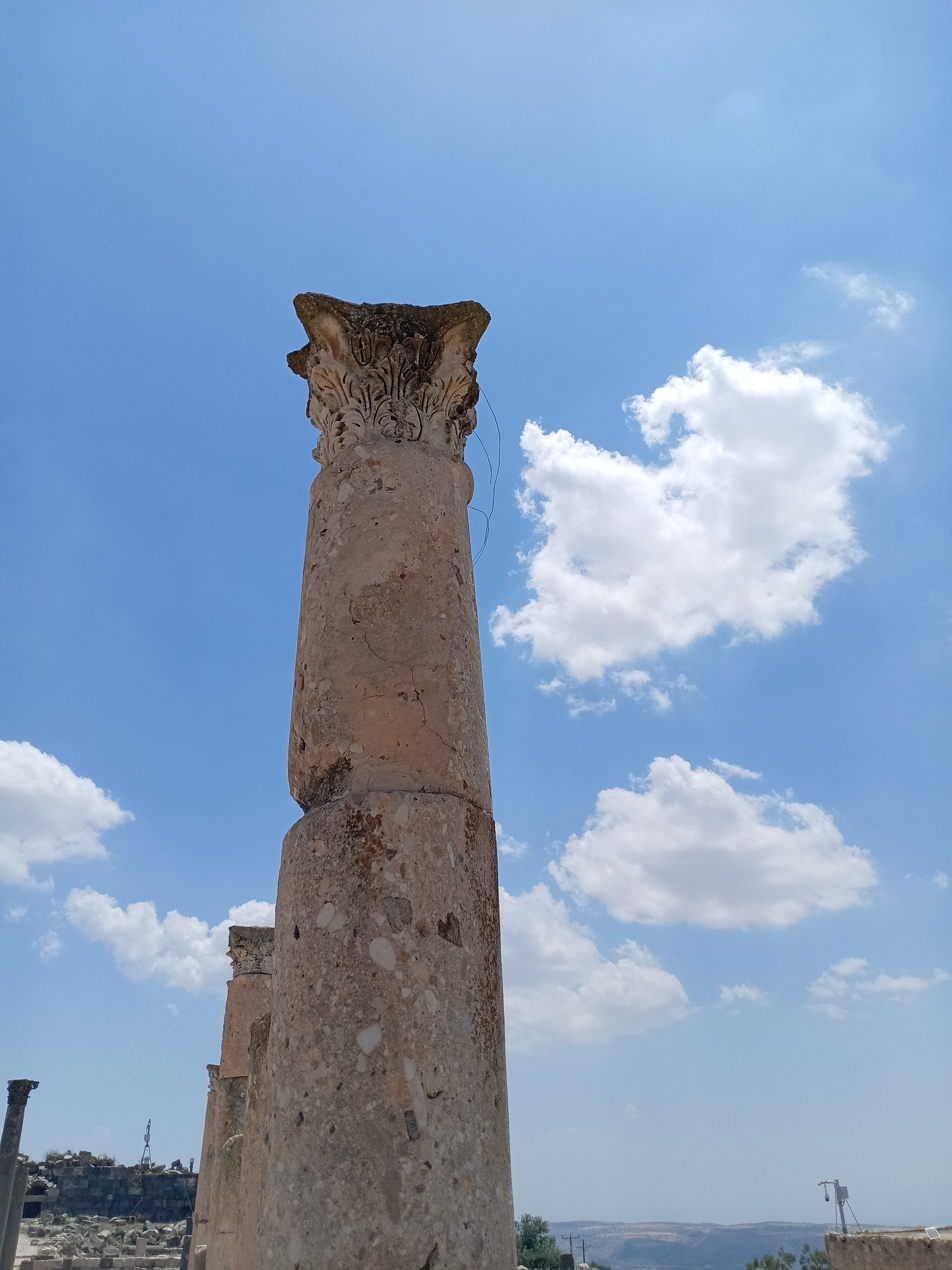

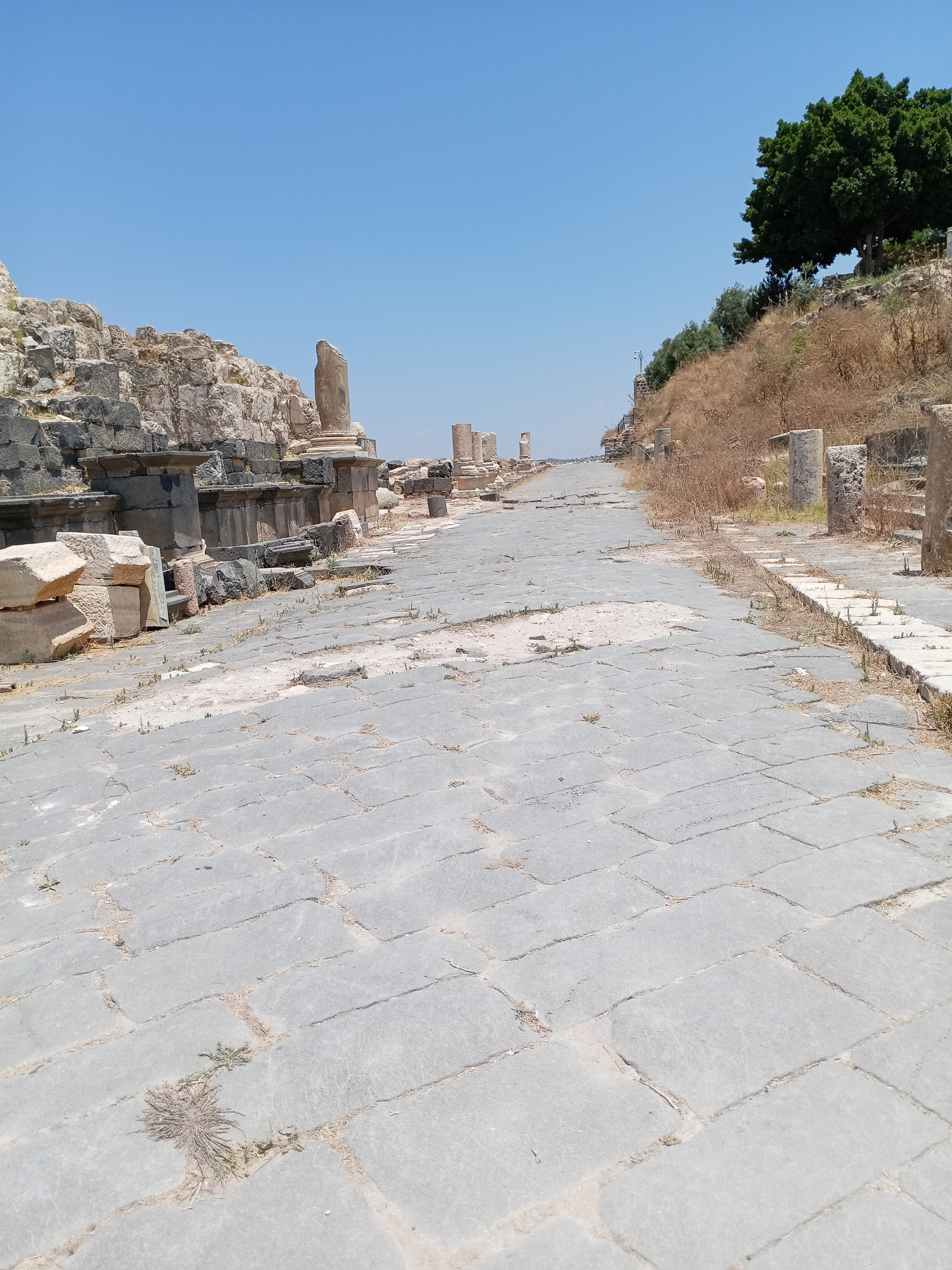

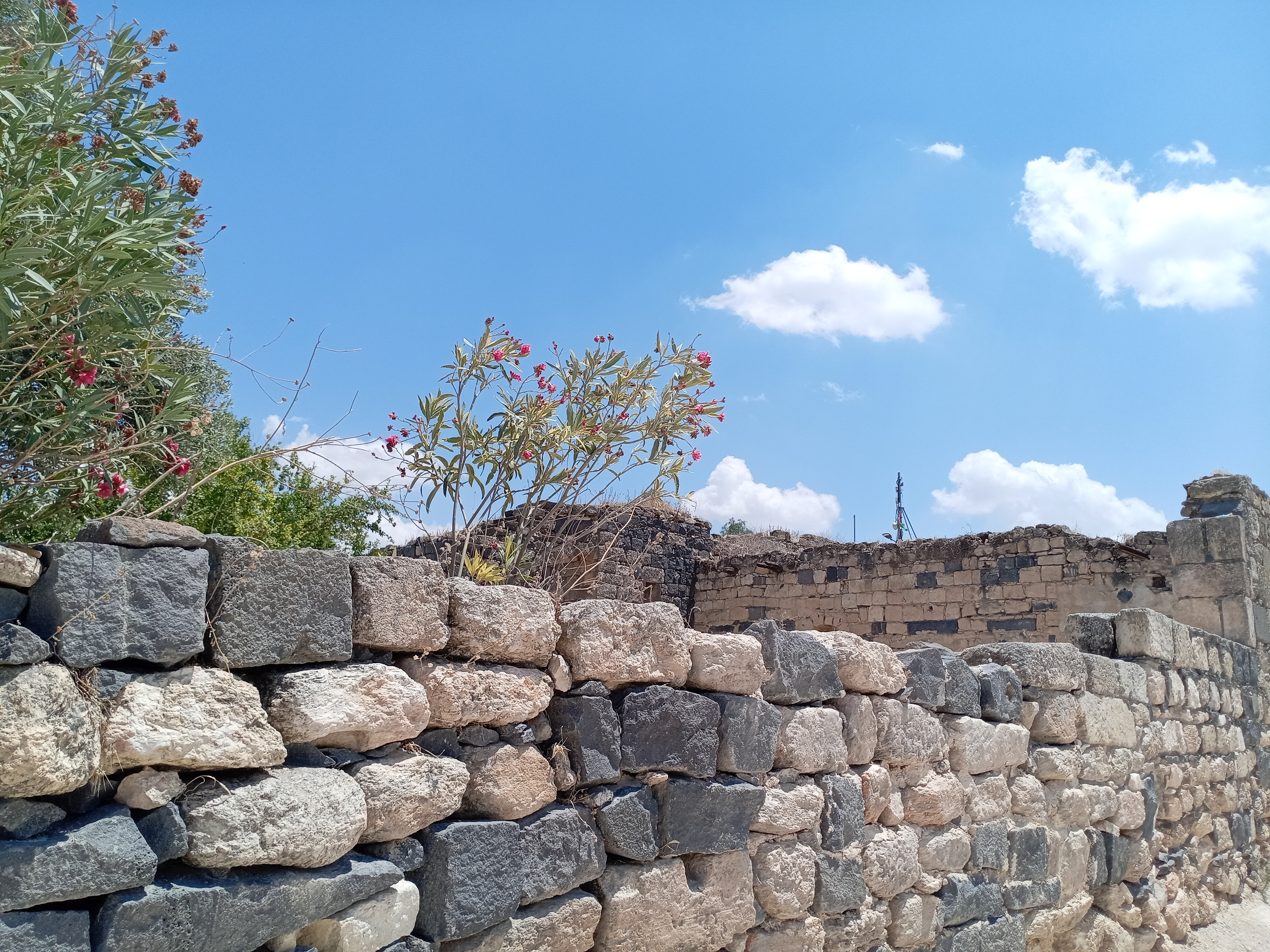

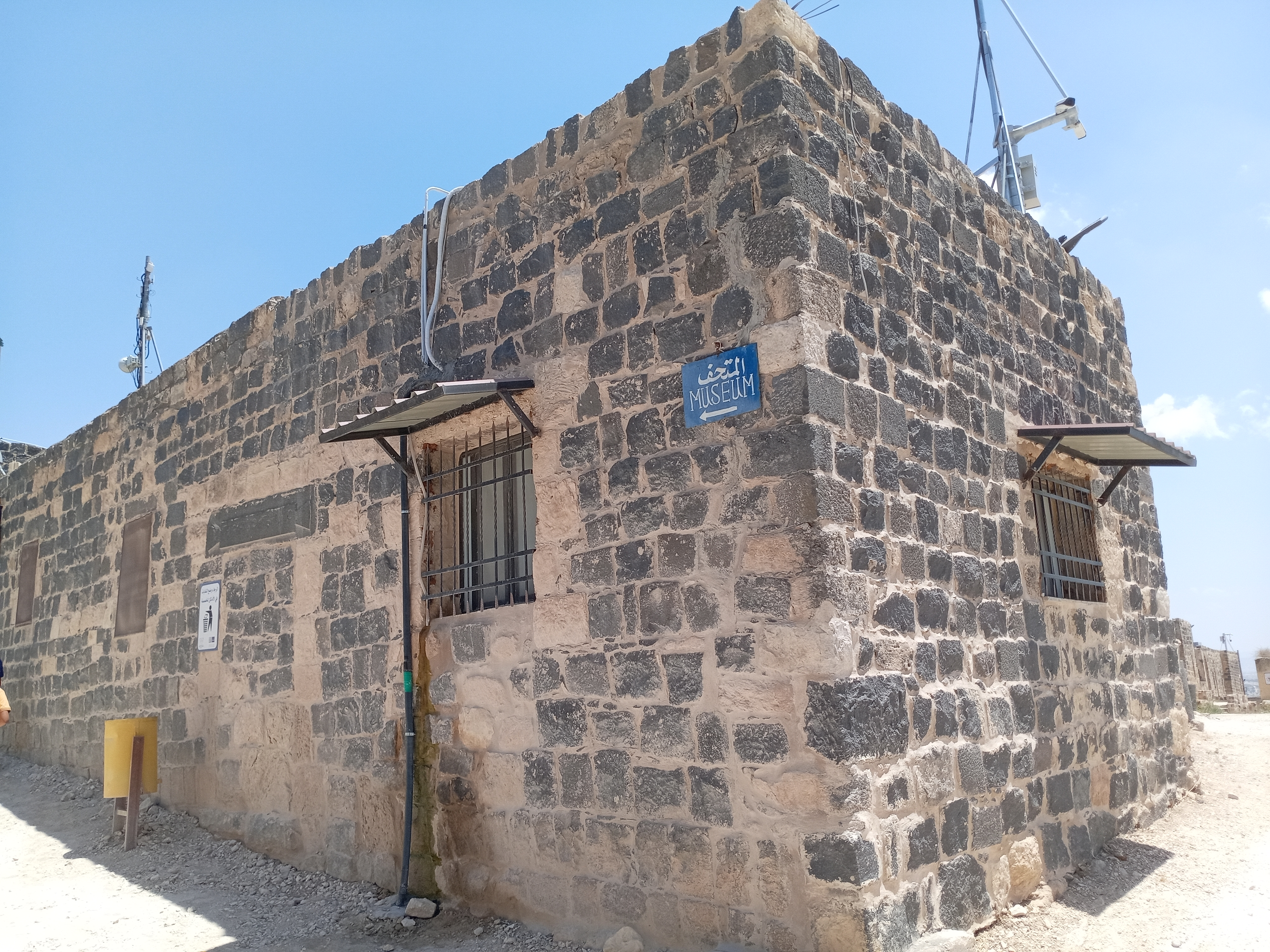

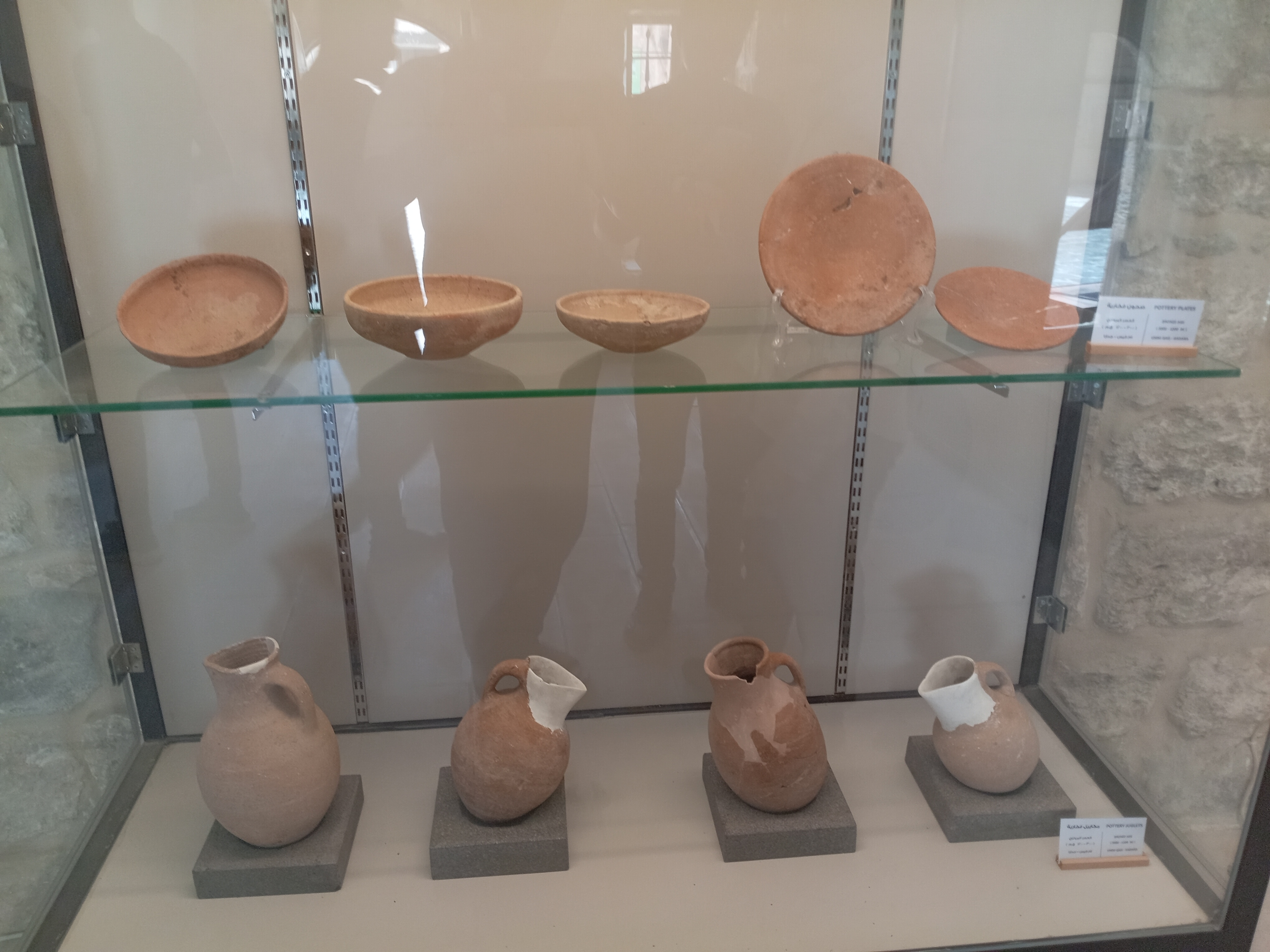
Inside the Umm Qais Museum

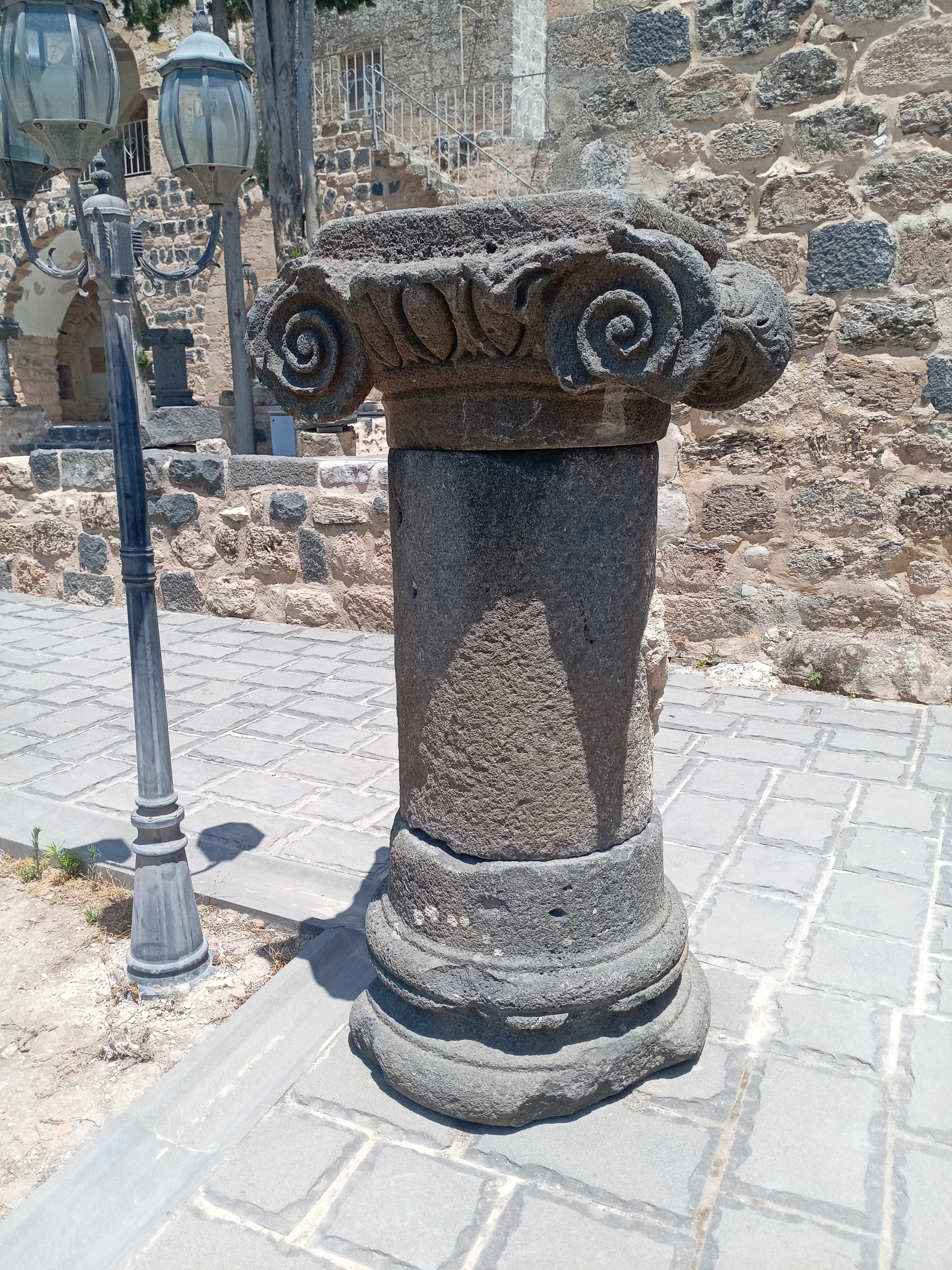

== Bibliography ==
- Government of Jordan, Department of Statistics (1964). First Census of Population and Housing. Volume I: Final Tables; General Characteristics of the Population (PDF).
- Hütteroth, W.-D.; Abdulfattah, K. (1977). Historical Geography of Palestine, Transjordan and Southern Syria in the Late 16th Century. Erlanger Geographische Arbeiten, Sonderband 5. Erlangen, Germany: Vorstand der Fränkischen Geographischen Gesellschaft. ISBN 3-920405-41-2.
- Robinson, E.; Smith, E. (1841). Biblical Researches in Palestine, Mount Sinai and Arabia Petraea: A Journal of Travels in the year 1838. Vol. 3. Boston: Crocker & Brewster.
- Weber, Thomas, Umm Qais: Gadara of the Decapolis (1989. Amman: Economic Press Co.)
