= Antiochus of Alexandria =

Greek writer

Antiochus (Ancient Greek: Ἀντίοχος) of Alexandria was a writer of ancient Greece who wrote a work on the Greek poets of the middle Attic comedy, called "On the Poets Satirized in Middle Comedy" (Περὶ τῶν ἐν τῇ μέσῃ κωμῳδίᾳ κωμῳδουμένον ποιητῶν). German classical scholar Johann Albert Fabricius suggested that this Antiochus was, perhaps, the same man as the mythographer Antiochus, who wrote a work on mythical traditions arranged according to the places where they were current. Some writers are inclined to consider the mythographer as the same with Publius Anteius Antiochus or Antiochus of Syracuse; but nothing certain can be said about the matter.
