= Antiochia in Scythia =

Antiochia in Scythia (Greek: Αντιόχεια της Σκυθίας) was an ancient city on the Jaxartes (now the Syr Darya river). The precise location is unknown, but it likely lies in Uzbekistan. Kanka, near Tashkent, and the Ferghana Valley have been proposed as possible locations. The Jaxartes river was the border between Sogdiana and Scythia in antiquity. In Seleucid times, Antiochia in Scythia and Alexandria Eschate (also on the Jaxartes) formed the last frontier of the Hellenistic world. (Pliny, Natural History, Book VI, ch. 18) It appears at the eastern end of the Tabula Peutingeriana map.
