= Antiochia Paraliou =

Ancient city known only from its coinage

Antiochia Paraliou (Greek: Αντιοχεία η Παράλιος) is an ancient city known only from its coinage which bears the legend "ΑΝΤΙΟΧΕΩΝ ΤΗΣ ΠΑΡΑΛΙΟΥ". Although the location is considered unknown, some numismatists equate the city with Antiochia ad Cragum, but the association is not universally accepted.
