= Antiochus (sculptor) =

Antiochus (Ancient Greek: Ἀντίοχος) was a sculptor of ancient Greece from Athens, whose name is inscribed on his statue of the goddess Athena in the Villa Ludovisi at Rome. It is unclear what became of the sculpture after the Villa Ludovisi was sold and torn down in 1885.

This sculpture is in the style of many similar ancient renditions of Athena.
