= Antiochia (Lydia) =

Antiochia in Lydia or Antiocheia in Lydia (Ancient Greek: Αντιόχεια της Λυδίας) was a Hellenistic city founded by Antiochus IV in Lydia, Anatolia (currently, Turkey). It is mentioned by the ancient geographer Stephanos Byzantinos as being located in Lydia, but its precise location is not currently known.
