= Ambassadors Fund for Cultural Preservation =

Department of State, Bureau of Educational and Cultural Affairs

The Ambassadors Fund for Cultural Preservation is one of many programs run by the U.S. Department of State's Bureau of Educational and Cultural Affairs as part of its mission of public diplomacy through educational and cultural programming and exchange. Only U.S. Ambassadors serving in eligible developing countries may participate in this program.

Established by the U.S. Department of State at the request of the U.S. Congress (Public Law 106-553) and administered by the Bureau's Cultural Heritage Center since 2001, the U.S. Ambassadors Fund for Cultural Preservation (AFCP) supports the preservation of cultural sites, cultural objects, and forms of traditional cultural expression in eligible countries. In requesting the establishment of AFCP, Congress noted that “Cultural preservation offers an opportunity to show a different American face to other countries, one that is non-commercial, non-political, and non-military. By taking a leading role in efforts to preserve cultural heritage, we show our respect for other cultures…”

The AFCP supports a wide range of projects to preserve cultural heritage, such as the restoration of historic buildings, archaeological site preservation, assessment and conservation of museum collections, improved storage conditions for archives and manuscripts, and the documentation of vanishing indigenous languages.

Since 2008, the AFCP has also supported a limited number of large-scale projects to preserve globally important ancient and historic sites.

== See also ==
- Cultural Heritage Center
- Kuruhinna Tharaagandu
