= Antiochis of Tlos =

Roman physician

Antiochis of Tlos (Greek: Ἀντιοχὶς Τλωὶς) was a Roman physician who lived in the 1st century BC or AD. She was the daughter of Diodotus of Tlos. Through her medical practice, she gained notoriety of citizens and politicians throughout the Lycian region.

== Work ==
Antiochis of Tlos likely began her education working alongside her father, who is likely the same famous Diodotus referenced in the Materia Medica of Dioscorides. An apprenticeship like this was common for individuals who could not attend one of the acclaimed medical schools of the time. While she may have started practicing medicine under the mentorship of her father, Antiochis branched off to an individual practice where she accumulated more skills and knowledge on her own. Her medical skills were referenced as τὴν ὶατρικὴν τέχνην ὲνπειρία, which is indicative that she practiced in the Hippocratic tradition.

Unlike many other female physicians, Antiochis was not a midwife that tended mainly to childbirth. Not only did she focus on diseases, she treated illnesses that afflicted patients who were both men and women. This unusual patient pool may have come to be if Antiochis administered house calls, which were more likely to facilitate the treatment of both genders.

== Statue and implications ==
In 1892, an Austrian expedition found a pedestal in Lycia. The statue was gone, but an inscription remained on the ruins, which date back to the time of Antiochis. The inscription reads:

Ἀντιοχὶς Διοδότου̣ Τλωὶς μαρτυρηθεῖσα ὑπὸ τῆς Τλωέων βουλῆς καὶ τοῦ δήμου ἐπὶ τῇ περὶ τὴν ἰατρικὴν τέχνην ἐνπειρίᾳ ἔστησεν τὸν ἀνδριάντα ἑαυτῆς’

This translates to “Antiochis of Tlos, daughter of Diodotus, commended by the council and the people of Tlos for her experience in the doctor’s art, has set up this statue of herself”.

This implies that Antiochis received official commendation from the city council of Tlos–an award granted by council vote. Such popularity corresponds to a city-wide reputation and a large medical practice. The reference to her medical skills is indicative of an extensive knowledge stemming from theoretical and practical experience. The language of the inscription may mean that Antiochis held the official position of city physician (evident by similarities to inscriptions of other city physicians, like Moschus Bellerophonteus). These physicians were hired by city council, granted a salary, and held responsibility for some public duties. The fact that she set the statue up herself means that Antiochis had ample funds and wanted to publicize her accomplishments (possibly as a physical note on the culture change associated with a successful female doctor). Even though the statue is lost (locating an image of the inscription on the ruins is a challenge), the inscription indicates that it was originally an image of Antiochis herself.

== References to Antiochis ==
Not only was Antiochis held with high regard by her city, but her reputation expanded across the world and well past her lifetime. Important medical writers and physicians referenced her as an authority for her work and treatments. The disease authority Asclepiades of Pharkmakion cited some of her remedies. Heraclides of Tarentum dedicated one of his books on preparing and testing drugs to her. Galen credits her with healing mixtures for spleen diseases, dropsy, sciatica, and arthritis. In these last records, there is evidence that Antiochis had people working directly for her.
