= Publius Anteius Antiochus =

Publius Anteius Antiochus, or Antiochus of Aegae (Ancient Greek: Ἀντίοχος), was a sophist—or, as he claimed to be, a Cynic philosopher—of ancient Rome, from the Cilician port city of Aegeae (modern Yumurtalık). He lived around the 2nd century AD, during the reigns of the Roman emperors Septimius Severus and Caracalla, and is known from a number of inscriptions that indicate him to have been a student of Philostratus, as well as a Syrian named Dardanus and a certain Milesian named Dionysius.

Antiochus belonged to a distinguished family, some members of which were afterwards raised to the consulship at Rome. He took no part in the political affairs of his native city, but with his large property, which was increased by the liberality of the emperors, he was enabled to support and relieve his fellow citizens whenever it was needed. He is said to have spent his nights in the temple of the Roman god of sleep Asclepius, partly on account of the dreams and the communications with the god in them, and partly on account of the conversation of other persons who likewise spent their nights there without being able to sleep. During the Parthian war of Caracalla he was at first of some service to the Roman army by his Cynic mode of life, but afterwards he deserted to the Parthians under Tiridates II of Armenia.

Antiochus was one of the most distinguished rhetoricians of his time. He used to speak extempore, and his declamations and orations are said to have been distinguished for their pathos, their richness in thought, and the precision of their style, which had nothing of the pomp and bombast of other rhetoricians. He also acquired some reputation as a writer. Philostratus mentions a historical work of his (ἱστορία) which is praised for the elegance of its style, but the subject of this history is unknown.

The grammarian Phrynichus Arabius mentions a writer of this name who produced a work called Agora (Ἀγορά), who may be the same author.

Antiochus was at some point in his career honored by the city of Argos for claiming kinship between Argos and Aegeae.
