= Antiochus Philometor =

Antiochus Philometor (Ancient Greek: Ἀντίοχος Φιλομήτωρ) is supposed by some persons to have been a physician, or druggist, who must have lived in or before the second century AD. He is the inventor of an antidote against poisonous reptiles, of which the prescription is embodied in a short Greek elegiac poem. The poem is inserted by Galen in one of his works, but nothing is known of the history of the author.

Others suppose that a physician of this name is not the author either of the poem or the antidote, but that they are connected in some way with the Theriaca which Antiochus the Great, king of Syria, was in the habit of using, and the prescription for which he dedicated in verse to Asclepius or Apollo.
