= Laodice =

Laodice (meaning "people-justice") may refer to:

== Greek mythology ==
- Laodice (mythology), several figures from Greek mythology, including:
  - Laodice (daughter of Priam), a princess of Troy

== Egypt ==
- Ladice of Cyrene (fl. 548 BC to 526 BC), a Cyrenaean princess, member of the Battiad dynasty, and consort of the ancient Egyptian pharaoh Amasis II (erroneously named Laodice by Montaigne in his essays)

== Noblewoman from the Seleucid Empire ==
- Laodice of Macedonia, wife of General Antiochus (fl. 4th century BC), mother of Seleucus I Nicator
- Laodice I (3rd century BC), queen of Antiochus II Theos and mother of Seleucus II Callinicus
- Laodice II (3rd century BC), queen of Seleucus II Callinicus
- Laodice III (fl. 222 BC), daughter of Mithridates II of Pontus and Laodice, first wife of Antiochus III the Great
- Laodice IV (fl. 3rd century BC & 2nd century BC), daughter of Antiochus III the Great and Laodice III, wife of Antiochus, Seleucus IV Philopator and Antiochus IV Epiphanes
- Laodice V (fl. 2nd century BC), daughter of Seleucus IV Philopator and Laodice IV, wife of Perseus of Macedon and later a possible wife of Demetrius I Soter
- Laodice (ca. 358–281 BC), daughter of Seleucus I Nicator and Apama
- Laodice (d. 261 BC), daughter of Antiochus I Soter and Stratonice of Syria
- Laodice (fl. 2nd century BC), daughter of Cleopatra Thea and Demetrius II Nicator, who married Phraates II of Parthia
- Laodice (fl. 2nd century BC), presumed daughter of Antiochus VII Sidetes and Cleopatra Thea
- Laodice of the Sameans (fl. 1st century BC), a queen of a tribe who asked king Antiochus X Eusebes for help against the Parthians

=== Relations of Eucratides I ===
- Laodice, mother of Eucratides I (reigned 170–145 BC) of Bactria, wife of Heliocles
- Laodice, another woman who was wife of Eucratides I

=== Relations of Mithridates II to Mithridates VI of Pontus ===
- Laodice (wife of Mithridates II of Pontus) (fl. 3rd century BC), daughter of Antiochus II Theos and Laodice I, wife of Mithridates II of Pontus
- Laodice of Pontus (fl. 213 BC), sister to Laodice III, another daughter of Mithridates II of Pontus and Laodice, wife of Seleucid general Achaeus
- Laodice (wife of Mithridates III of Pontus) (fl. 3rd century BC & flourished 2nd century BC), wife of Mithridates III of Pontus
- Laodice (sister-wife of Mithridates IV of Pontus) (fl. 2nd century BC), daughter to Mithridates III of Pontus and Laodice, sister-wife of Mithridates IV of Pontus
- Nysa of Cappadocia also known as Laodice (fl. 2nd century BC), daughter of Pharnaces I of Pontus and Nysa, wife of Ariarathes V of Cappadocia, mother of Ariarathes VI of Cappadocia
- Laodice VI (fl. 2nd century BC), daughter of Antiochus IV Epiphanes and Laodice IV, wife of Mithridates V of Pontus
- Laodice of Cappadocia (fl. 2nd century BC & 1st century BC), daughter of Mithridates V of Pontus and Laodice VI, wife of Ariarathes VI of Cappadocia
- Laodice (sister-wife of Mithridates VI of Pontus) (fl. 2nd century BC & 1st century BC), daughter of Mithridates V of Pontus and Laodice VI, sister-wife and first wife of Mithridates VI of Pontus

=== Relations of Antiochus I Theos of Commagene ===
- Laodice VII Thea (born after 122 BC), daughter of Antiochus VIII Grypus, and wife of Mithridates I Callinicus and mother of Antiochus I Theos of Commagene
- Laodice of Parthia (1st century BC), daughter of Antiochus I Theos of Commagene, and wife of Orodes II of Parthia

== See also ==
- Laodicea (disambiguation)
- Laoticus (disambiguation)
- Laodicus (disambiguation)
