= Mithridatic dynasty =

Former dynasty of Pontus (281 - 47 BC)

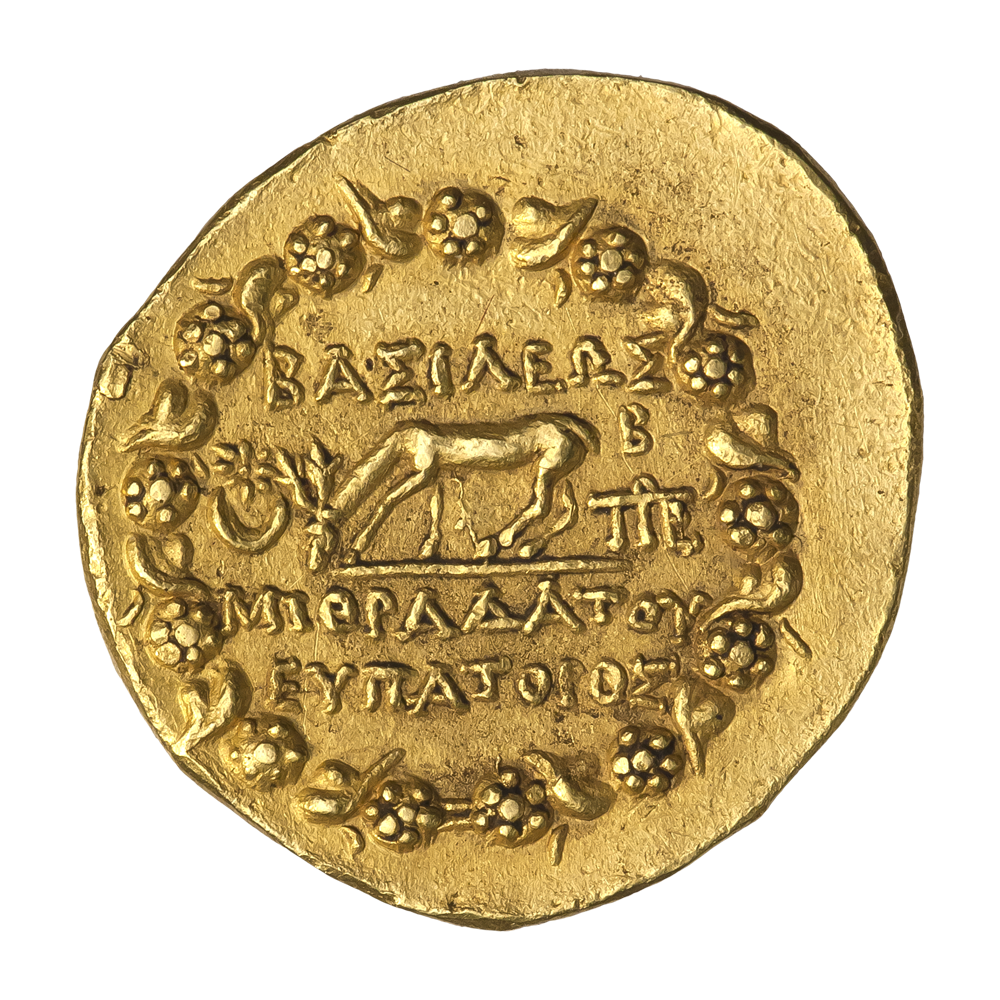
- Coin of Mithridates VI
- Parent house: Pharnacid dynasty (?)
- Country: Kingdom of Pontus; Bosporan Kingdom
- Founded: 281 BC
- Founder: Mithridates I Ktistes
- Current head: Extinct
- Final ruler: Pharnaces II of Pontus
- Titles: King of Pontus; King of the Cimmerian Bosphorus
- Dissolution: 47 BC; 37 BC last ruler (Arsaces of Pontus, Roman-appointed); Rhescuporis VI

The Mithridatic dynasty, also known as the Pontic dynasty, was a hereditary dynasty of Persian origin, founded by Mithridates I Ktistes (Mithridates III of Cius) in 281 BC. The origins of the dynasty were located in the highest circles of the ruling Persian nobility in Cius. Mithridates III of Cius fled to Paphlagonia after the murder of his father and his predecessor Mithridates II of Cius, eventually proclaiming the Kingdom of Pontus, and adopting the epithet of "Ktistes" (literally, Builder). The dynasty reached its greatest extent under the rule of Mithridates VI, who is considered the greatest ruler of the Kingdom of Pontus.

They were prominent enemies of the Roman Republic during the Mithridatic Wars during the reign of Mithridates VI until the late 60s BC. In 48 BC, the Roman client king of Crimea, Pharnaces II, attempted to press his claim on Pontus, but was decisively defeated by Julius Caesar at the Battle of Zela.

== History ==
The Mithridatids reached their greatest extent under the rule of Mithridates VI, who conquered the neighboring territories of Colchis and Trapezos, as well as succeeding in becoming ruler of the Bosporan Kingdom after the death of Paerisades V.

This however, did not last long. His son and successor was ousted from rule of the Pontic Kingdom after his defeat at Zela, leaving only the Bosporan Kingdom under direct Mithridatid control, who nonetheless also was ousted from power by the general Asander.

The dynasty, through Dynamis, the daughter of Mithridates VI, and her offspring, would continue to rule the Bosporan Kingdom until 342 AD. The Bosporan Kingdom would remain the longest lasting client-state of the Roman Empire. Their descendants include:

- Mithridates III, who opposed Roman rule during the Roman-Bosporan War.
- Cotys I, who supported the Romans against his brother Mithridates.
- Sauromates II, who expanded the kingdom and inflicted serious injuries to the Scythian and Siracian tribes.
- Rhescuporis VI, the final ruler of the Bosporan Kingdom who died in 342 AD.

== Kings of Pontus ==
Kings of Pontus
King	Reign (BC)	Consort(s)	Comments
Mithridates I Ctistes	281–266 BC		Ctistes meaning Builder
Ariobarzanes	266–250 BC		son of Mithridates I
Mithridates II	c.250 – c.210 BC	Laodice	Son of Ariobarzanes
Mithridates III	c.210 – c.190 BC	Laodice	Laodice may have been the daughter of Antiochus IV
Pharnaces I	c.190 – c. 155 BC	Nysa	Eldest son of Mithridates III
Mithridates IV Philopator Philadelphus	155–150 BC	Laodice	Laodice was his sister-wife.
Mithridates V Euergetes	150-120 BC	Laodice VI	
Mithridates Chrestus	120-116 BC	None	Jointly Succeeded with brother Mithridates VI, who was forced into hiding. When brother came out Chrestus lost throne.
Mithridates VI Eupator	120–63 BC	Multiple	Led Mithridatic Wars against Rome.
Pharnaces II	63–47 BC		Last direct ruler of the Kingdom of Pontus

== Family tree of Mithridatids, kings of Pontus ==
Mithridates I Ctistes king of Pontus; 281-266 BC; MITHRIDATIDS	Antiochus I Soter	Achaeus I
Ariobarzanes king of Pontus; 266-c.250 BC	Antiochus II Theos	Andromachus
Mithridates II king of Pontus c.250-c.210 BC	Laodice	Seleucus II Callinicus
Mithridates III king of Pontus c.210-c.190 BC	Laodice III	Antiochus III the Great	Laodice	Achaeus II
Antiochus	Antiochus IV Epiphanes
Mithridates IV king of Pontus c.155-c.150 BC	Laodice	Pharnakes I king of Pontus c.190-c.155 BC	Nyssa of Seleucids
Ariarathes V king of Cappadocia	Nyssa of Mithridatids	Mithridates V Euergetes king of Cappadocia c.150-120 BC	Laodice VI
Ariarathes VI king of Cappadocia	Laodice of Cappadocia	1.Laodice	Mithridates VI of Pontus the Great king of Pontus.120-63 BC	2.Monime; 3.Berenice of Chios; 4.Stratonice of Pontus; 6.Hypsicratea	Mithridates Chrestus
(1) Mithridates ruler of Colchis	(1) Arcathias general	(1) Machares king of Cimmerian Bospsrus	(1) Pharnaces II king of Pontus; 63-47 BC	(1) Cleopatra ∞ Tigranes II of Armenia	(1) Drypetina	(2) Athenais Philostorgos II ∞ Ariobarzanes II of Cappadocia	(4) Xiphares prince	(5) Mithrithates I king of Cimmerian Bosporus	(illeg.) Adobogiona the Younger ∞ Castor of Galatia	(illeg.) Ariarathes IX king of Cappadocia	(illeg.) Orsabaris ∞ 1.Socrates Chrestus; 2.Lycomedes of Comana	(illeg.) daughter ∞ Archelaus general
Darius king of Pontus	Arsaces prince	Gepaepyris	1.Asander Philicaesar Philoromaios king of Cimmerian Bosporus; 47-17 AD	Dynamis queen of C. Bosporus 16-8 BC ∞ Scribonius king of C. Bosporus; 17-16 BC	3.Polemon I Pythodoros king of Pontus; 16-8 BC	Pythodoris queen of Pontus; 8 BC-38 AD	Archelaus king of Cappadocia
T. J. Mithridates king of Cimmerian Bosporus; 38 AD-45	T. J. Cotys I king of Cimmerian Bosporus; 45 AD-63	T. J. Aspurgus king of Cimmerian Bospsorus; 8 BC-38 AD	Polemon II king of Pontus; 38 AD-74

== Sources ==
- Dueck, Daniela (2002). Strabo of Amasia: A Greek Man of Letters in Augustan Rome. Routledge. ISBN 978-1134605613. "The independent Pontic dynasty originated in the highest circles of the ruling Persian nobility in Cius."
