= Nysa (daughter of Nicomedes III of Bithynia) =

Nysa or Nyssa (Greek: Νύσ(σ)α, flourished second half of 2nd century BC and first half of 1st century BC) was a Greek princess from the kingdom of Bithynia.

== Biography ==
Nysa was the daughter of monarchs Nicomedes III of Bithynia and Nysa, a princess from the kingdom of Cappadocia. She was the namesake of her mother and had several half-brothers, Nicomedes IV of Bithynia (reigned from c. 94 BC to c. 74 BC) from her father's first marriage to Aristonica, Socrates Chrestus born by her father's concubine Hagne, and possibly Pylaemenes III by an unknown woman (whom her father placed as king of Paphlagonia). She was born and raised in Bithynia.

According to Suetonius (Caesar. 49), her cause was defended by the Roman politician Gaius Julius Caesar in gratitude for her father's friendship.

== Cultural depictions ==
Nysa is mentioned but does not appear in the novel The October Horse by Colleen McCullough. She appears briefly in Hail, Caesar! by Fletcher Pratt.

== Ancestry ==
Ancestors of Nysa (daughter of Nicomedes III of Bithynia)

16. Prusias I Cholus, King of Bithynia
8. Prusias II Cynegus, King of Bithynia
17. Apama III
4. Nicomedes II, King of Bithynia
9. Apama IV
2. Nicomedes III Euergetes, King of Bithynia
1. Nysa of Bithynia
24. Ariarathes IV Eusebes, King of Cappadocia
12. Ariarathes V Eusebes Philopator, King of Cappadocia
25. Antiochis
6. Ariarathes VI Epiphanes Philopator, King of Cappadocia
26. Pharmaces I, King of Pontus (=28)
13. Nysa
27. Nysa (=29)
3. Nysa
28. Pharmaces I, King of Pontus (=26)
14. Mithridates V Euergetes, King of Pontus
29. Nysa (=27)
7. Laodice
30. Antiochus IV Epiphanes, Basileus of the Seleucid Empire
15. Laodice VI
31. Laodice IV

== Sources ==
- McGing, B. C., The foreign policy of Mithridates VI Eupator, King of Pontus (Mnemosyne Series, Suppl.89), BRILL, 1986; ISBN 978-9004075917
- Smith, Dictionary of Greek and Roman Biography and Mythology, v. 2, page 1218
