= Battle of Ancyra =

Battle of the Seleucid Civil War between Seleucus II and Antiochus Hierax

Date	239 BC
Location	Ancyra (modern-day Ankara, Turkey)
Result	Victory of Antiochus Hierax

Belligerents
Seleucid Empire	Antiochus Hierax; Kingdom of Pontus; Galatians

Commanders and leaders
Seleucus II Callinicus	Antiochus Hierax; Mithridates II of Pontus

Strength
Unknown	Unknown

Casualties and losses
Heavy, possibly 20,000	Unknown, low

The Battle of Ancyra was fought in ca. 239 BC between the Seleucid King Seleucus II Callinicus and his brother Prince Antiochus Hierax. Civil war had raged in the Seleucid Empire since 244 BC, when Queen Laodice I had supported her son Antiochus in a rebellion against Seleucus. Antiochus fought to establish his own kingdom in Anatolia. He was able to take advantage of his brother's distraction and defeat at the hands of Ptolemy III in the Third Syrian War. By 239 BC Seleucus had made peace with Ptolemy and having rebuilt his army, invaded Anatolia.

After the war had lasted two years or so, during which we have no information on its progress, Seleucus was defeated in a great battle against the united forces of Mithridates II of Pontus, Hierax and the Galatians near Ancyra, in around 239 BC. Seleucus was barely able to escape with his life, but lost around 20,000 of his soldiers.

Antiochus' victory at Ancyra (modern Ankara, Turkey) forced Seleucus to relinquish his territories in Anatolia to him and content himself with the Seleucid lands east of the Taurus mountains.
