= Cimiata =

Ancient town

Coordinates: 40°59′39″N 33°40′43″E

Cimiata or Kimiata (Ancient Greek: τὰ Κιμίατα) was a hill town of ancient Paphlagonia, which gave its name to a division of Paphlagonia named Cimiatene. It was situated at the foot of the Olgassys.

Cimiata was a strong fortress located at the foot of the mountainous region of Olgassys in Paphlagonia. It was within the district called Cimiatene (Κιμιατηνή). Mithridates I of Pontus used Cimiata as a base of operations when he established himself as ruler of Pontus, and his descendants continued the dynasty down to Mithridates Eupator.

Its site was previously located near Kurmalar, Asiatic Turkey. However, view of new studies and epigraphic survey, this site is probably more located at Asar Tepe, near Deresamail village close to Eskipazar.
