= Mithridates V Euergetes =

King of Pontus

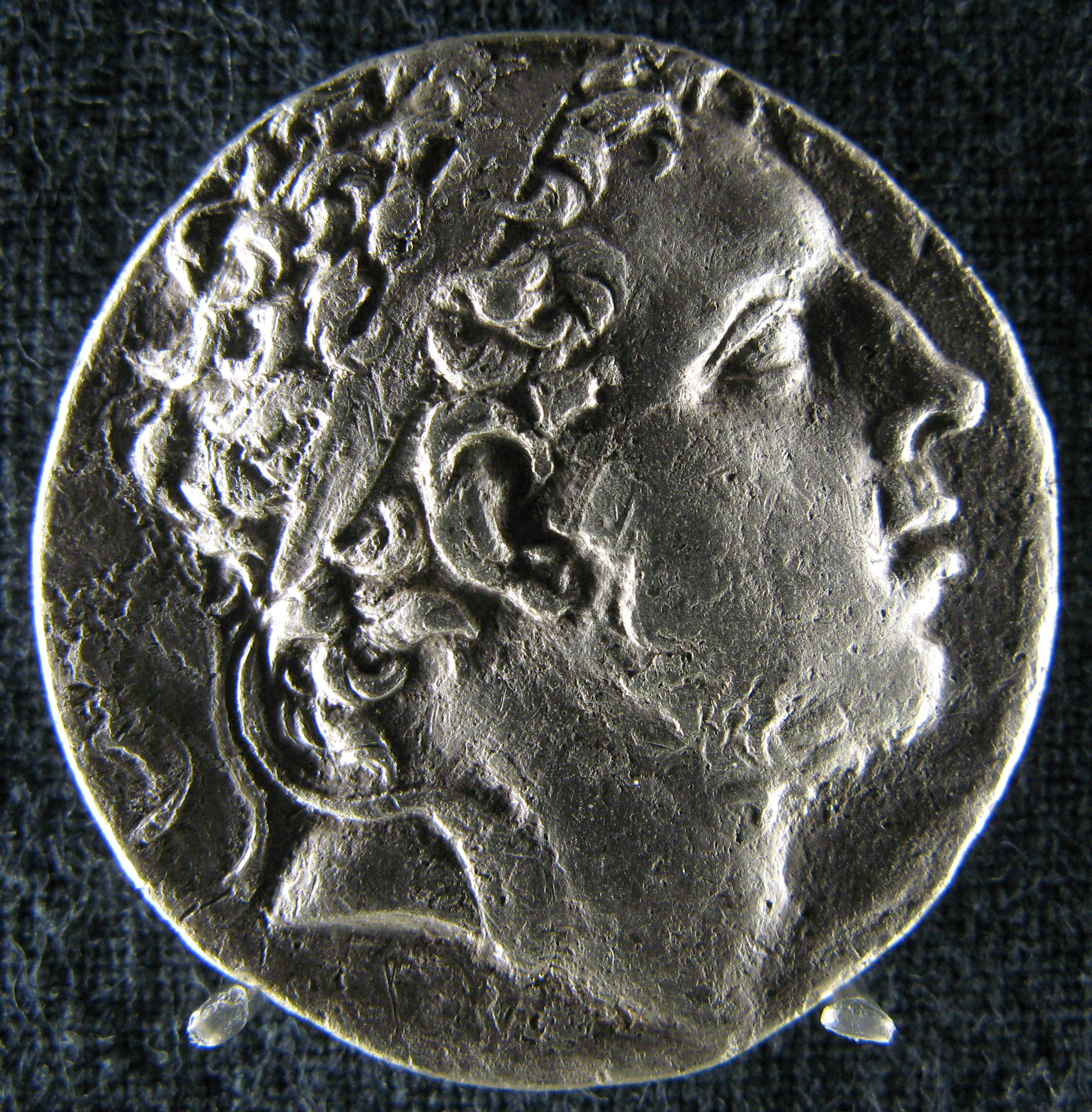
- Tetradrachm of Mithradates

King of Pontus
- Reign: c. 150 – c. 120 BC
- Predecessor: Mithridates IV and Laodice
- Successor: Mithridates VI
- Died: c. 120 BC; Sinope, Pontus
- Burial: Amasya, Amasya Province, Turkey
- Spouses: Laodice VI of Seleucids
- Issue: Berenice; Mithridates VI; Mithridates Chrestus; Laodice
- House: Mithridatic
- Father: Pharnaces I
- Mother: Nysa

Mithridates or Mithradates V Euergetes (Ancient Greek: Μιθριδάτης ὁ Eὐεργέτης, which means "Mithridates the Benefactor"; died c. 120 BC) was a prince and the seventh king of the Kingdom of Pontus.

== Life ==
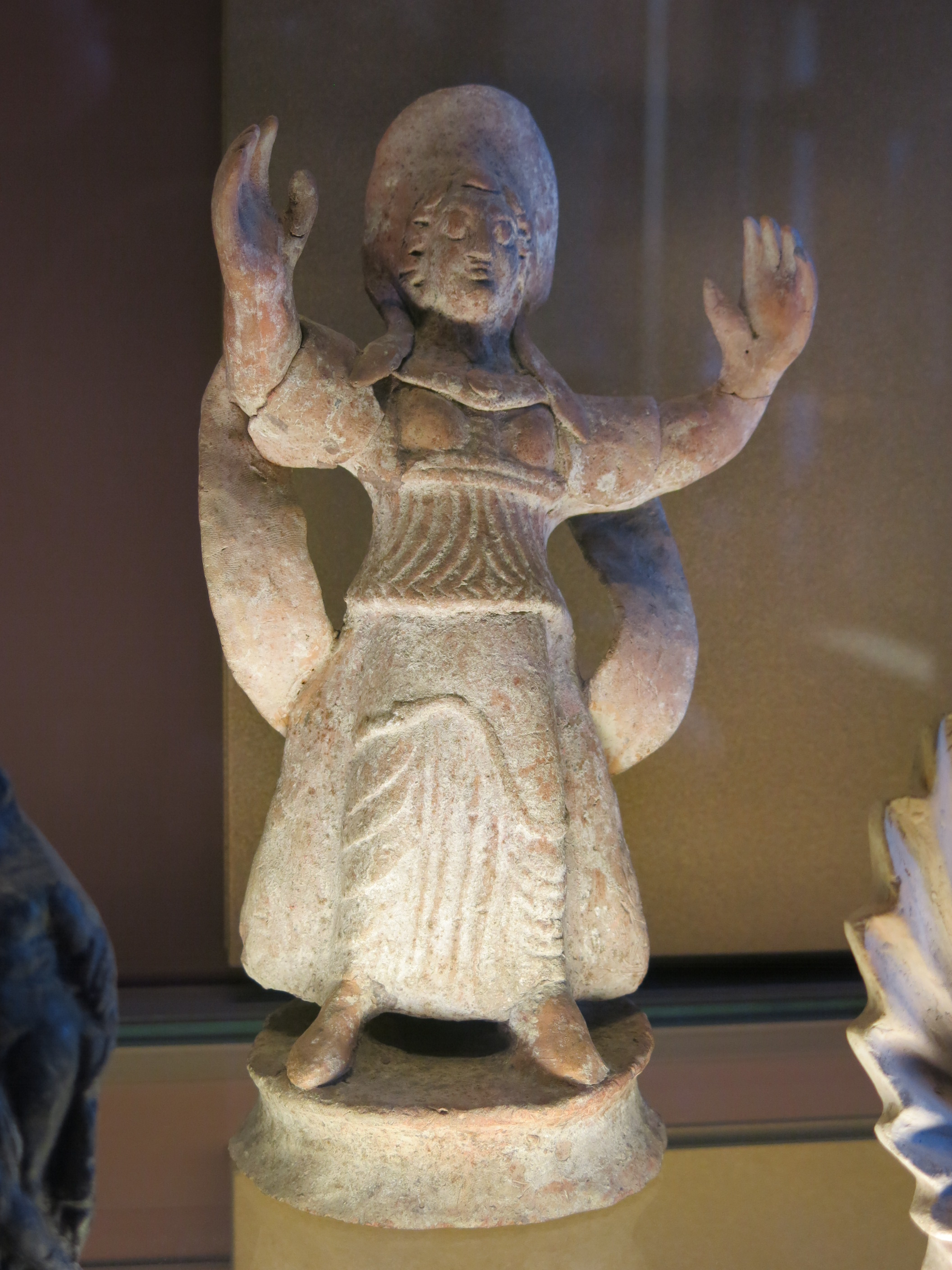
Terracotta in the Louvre

Mithridates V was of Greek Macedonian and Persian ancestry. He was the son of the King Pharnaces I and Queen Nysa, while his sister was Nysa of Cappadocia. His mother is believed to have died during childbirth, while giving birth to either him or his sister. He was born and raised in the Kingdom of Pontus. Mithridates V succeeded his paternal aunt Laodice and paternal uncle Mithridates IV on the Pontic throne, but the circumstance of his accession is uncertain.

Mithridates V continued the alliance with Rome started by his predecessors. He supported them with some ships and a small auxiliary force during the Third Punic War and at a subsequent period rendered them useful assistance in the war against the King of Pergamon, Eumenes III (131–129 BC).

For his services on this occasion, Mithridates V was rewarded by the Roman consul Manius Aquillius with the province of Phrygia. However, the acts of the Roman consul were rescinded by the Roman Senate on the grounds of bribery, but it appears that he maintained his possession of Phrygia until his death. Mithridates V also increased the power of Pontus by the marriage of his eldest child, his daughter Laodice to King Ariarathes VI. The end of his reign can only be approximately determined based on statements concerning the accession of his son Mithridates VI, which is assigned to the year 120 BC, signaling the end of the reign of Mithridates V.

Mithridates V was assassinated around 120 BC in Sinope, poisoned by unknown persons at a lavish banquet which he held. Mithridates V was a great benefactor to the Hellenic culture which shows on surviving coinage and honorific inscriptions stating his donations in Athens and Delos and held the Greek God Apollo in great veneration. A bilingual inscription dedicated to him is displayed at the Capitoline Museums in Rome. Mithridates V was buried in the royal tombs of his ancestors at Amasya.

== Family ==
Mithridates V married the Greek Seleucid Princess Laodice VI, who was the daughter of Antiochus IV Epiphanes and Laodice IV. Mithridates V and Laodice VI were related, thus he was connected to the Seleucid dynasty.

Laodice and Mithridates V had seven children: Laodice of Cappadocia, Mithridates VI, Mithridates Chrestus, Laodice, Nysa (sometimes spelt as Nyssa), Roxana and Statira. Roxana and Statira were compelled to kill themselves with poison after the fall of Pontus in 63 BC. Nysa was taken prisoner by the Romans and made to march in the triumphs of two Roman generals.

== Sources ==
- Smith, William (editor); Dictionary of Greek and Roman Biography and Mythology, "Mithridates V", Boston, (1867)
- Walbank, W. The Cambridge ancient history: The Hellenistic world, Volume 7 F. Cambridge University Press, 1984
- McGing, B.C. The foreign policy of Mithridates VI Eupator, King of Pontus, BRILL, 1986
- Hazel, J. Who's Who in the Roman World, "Mithridates V Euergetes", 2002
- Erciyas, D.B. Wealth, aristocracy and royal propaganda under the Hellenistic kingdom of the Mithradatids in the Central Black Sea Region in Turkey, BRILL, 2006
- Mayor, A. The Poison King: the life and legend of Mithradates, Rome’s deadliest enemy, Princeton University Press, 2009
- Dakshveer Singh

Preceded by Mithridates IV	King of Pontus c. 150 BC – 120 BC	Succeeded by Mithridates VI
