= Nysa (wife of Pharnaces I of Pontus) =

Queen of Pontus
- Spouse: Pharnaces I of Pontus
- Issue: Mithridates V of Pontus, Nysa of Cappadocia
- Father: Antiochus
- Mother: Laodice IV

Nysa or Nyssa (Greek: Νύσ(σ)α, c. 2nd century BC) was a Greek Seleucid princess and a queen of the Kingdom of Pontus.

== Biography ==
Nysa was of Greek Macedonian and Persian descent. She was a daughter of the Seleucid Prince Antiochus and Seleucid Queen Laodice IV. Her parents were blood siblings and her parents' marriage was the first sibling marriage to occur in the Seleucid dynasty. The grandparents of Nysa were the Seleucid King Antiochus III the Great and Seleucid Queen Laodice III. Her father Antiochus, was appointed by Antiochus III to succeed him as his first heir.

Nysa was born between 196 BC and 193 BC. In 193 BC, her father had died. Her family grieved over his death, in particular, Antiochus III. Laodice IV, later married her brothers Seleucus IV Philopator and Antiochus IV Epiphanes, who were both uncles and stepfathers of Nysa. Through her mother's marriages, she had various half brothers and sisters.

In the year 172 BC or 171 BC, thanks to the diplomatic efforts of her maternal half-brother Seleucid King Demetrius I Soter, Nysa married the King Pharnaces I of Pontus. The marriage between Pharnaces and Nysa represented a continuation and a strengthening of the pro-Seleucid orientation of Pontus' foreign policy. Through his marriage to Nysa, Pharnaces tried to increase his political influence and Pontian power and affairs in foreign political relations with the Roman Republic and across Anatolia. Nysa and Pharnaces were related as he was a first cousin to Nysa's parents, thus Pharnaces was related to the Seleucid dynasty. Little is known on Nysa's relationship with Pharnaces and how she reigned as Queen of Pontus.

Honorific statues and inscriptions have survived that were dedicated to Nysa. Pharnaces set about establishing good relations with the citizens of Athens and the Greek island of Delos. Pharnaces made a donation to the people of Athens. While the exact nature of the donation is unknown, it is thought that Pharnaces' donation to Athens occurred soon after 183 BC. A lengthy inscription from the Athenians on Delos honours Pharnaces and Nysa. Pharnaces and Nysa received a crown of gold from them and bronze statues of themselves were set up on Delos. Their lengthy Athenian honorific inscription is dated during the archonship of the Athenian Tychandrus or Tychander which is now generally accepted to around 160 BC or 159 BC.

Nysa bore Pharnaces two children: a son called Mithridates V of Pontus and a daughter called Nysa of Cappadocia, who was also known as Laodice. Nysa is believed to have died during childbirth.

== Sources ==
- B.C. McGing, The foreign policy of Mithridates VI Eupator, King of Pontus, BRILL, 1986
- J.D. Grainger, A Seleukid prosopography and gazetteer, BRILL, 1997
