= Cimiatene =

Ancient division of Paphlagonia

Cimiatene (/ˌsɪmiəˈtiːni/; Ancient Greek: Kιμιατηνή) was an ancient division of Paphlagonia, which took its name from a hill fort, Cimiata, at the foot of the range of Olgassys. Mithridates Ktistes slightly after 302 BC made this his first stronghold and was a headquarters during his conquest of Pontus. The territory remained a possession of the kings of Pontus until the death of Mithridates Eupator in 63 BC and the fall of the kingdom.

Cimiatene, as it was more to the north and nearer the sea, was less mountainous. According to Strabo, it was principally watered by the river Amnias, which was known as the location of a great battle between Nicomedes, king of Bithynia, and Mithridates Europator.
