= Pharnaces I of Pontus =

2nd-century-BC King of Pontus

Pharnaces I
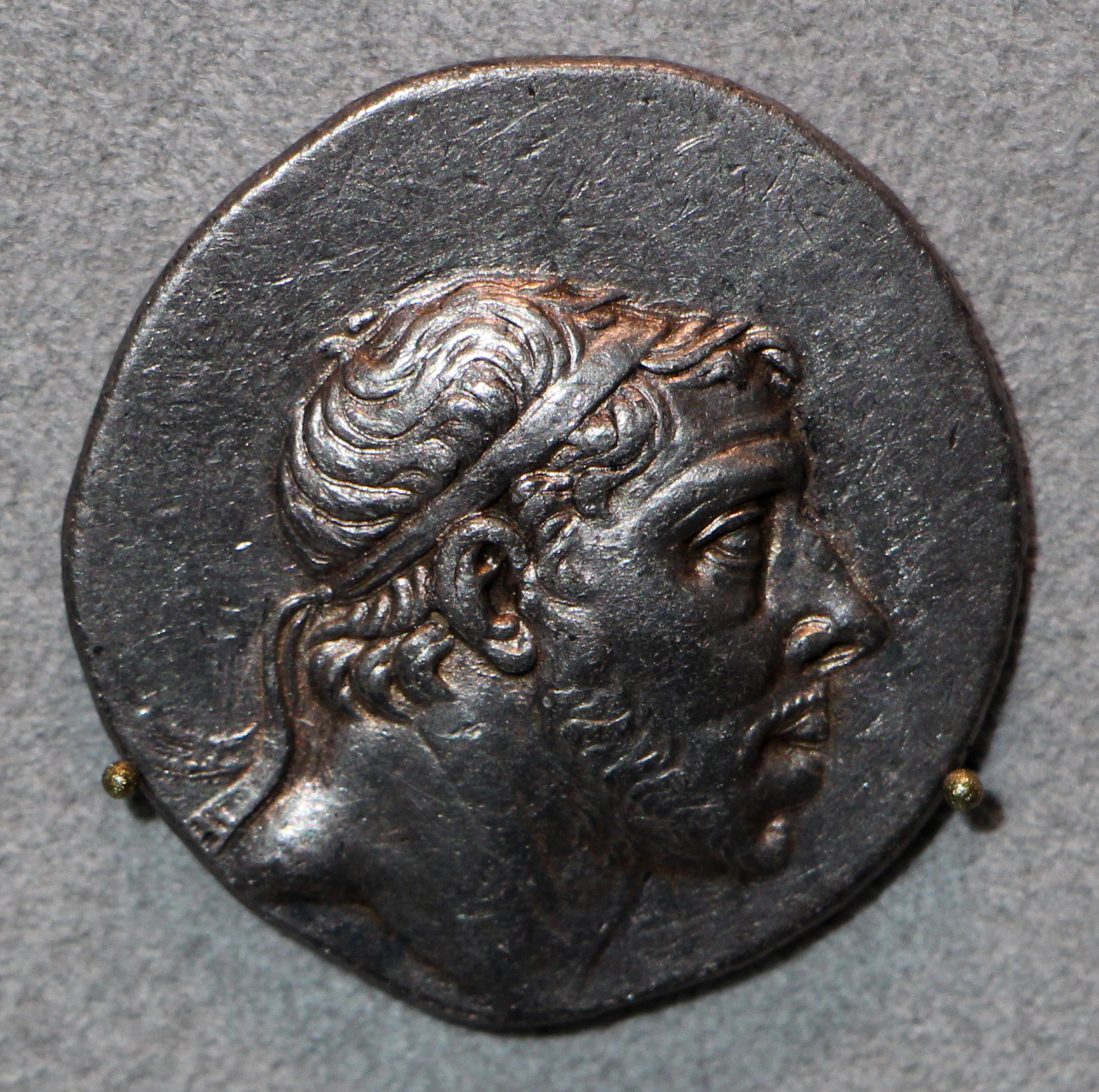
- Tetradrachm of Pharnaces I of Pontus

King of Pontus
- Reign: c. 190 BC – c. 155 BC
- Predecessor: Mithridates III of Pontus
- Successor: Mithridates IV and Laodice
- Spouse: Nysa
- Issue: Mithridates V of Pontus; Nysa of Cappadocia
- Dynasty: Mithridatic dynasty
- Father: Mithridates III of Pontus
- Mother: Laodice

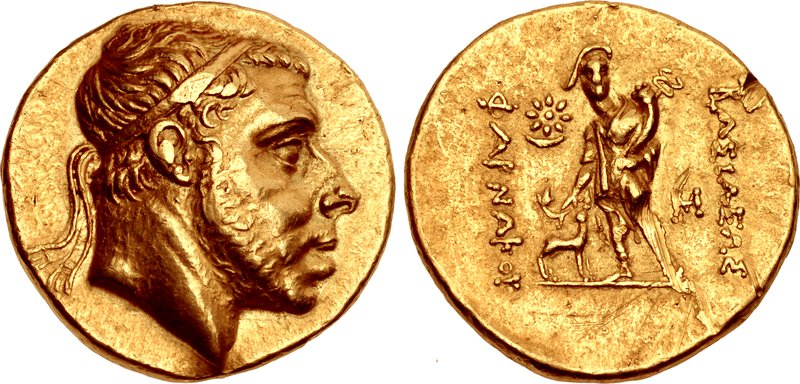
Pharnaces I of Pontus; 185?–169 BC; Son of Mithridates III. The Greek inscription reads: "ΒΑΣΙΛΕΩΣ ΦΑΡΝΑΚΟΥ", which means "[of] King Pharnaces".

Pharnaces I (Greek: Φαρνάκης; lived 2nd century BC) was the fifth king of Pontus. Of Persian and Greek ancestry, he was the son of King Mithridates III of Pontus and his wife Laodice, whom he succeeded on the throne. Pharnaces had two siblings: a brother called Mithridates IV of Pontus and a sister called Laodice who both succeeded Pharnaces. He was born and raised in the Kingdom of Pontus.

== Life ==
The date of his accession cannot be fixed with certainty; but it is certain, at least, that he was on the throne before 183 BC, in which year he succeeded in reducing the important city of Sinope, which had been long an object of ambition to the Kings of Pontus. The Rhodians sent an embassy to Rome to complain of this aggression, but without effect. About the same time Pharnaces became involved in disputes with his neighbour, King of Pergamon, Eumenes II, which led to repeated embassies from both monarchs to Rome, as well as to partial hostilities. But in the spring of 181 BC, without waiting for the return of his ambassadors, Pharnaces suddenly attacked both Eumenes II and King Ariarathes IV of Cappadocia and invaded Galatia with a large force.

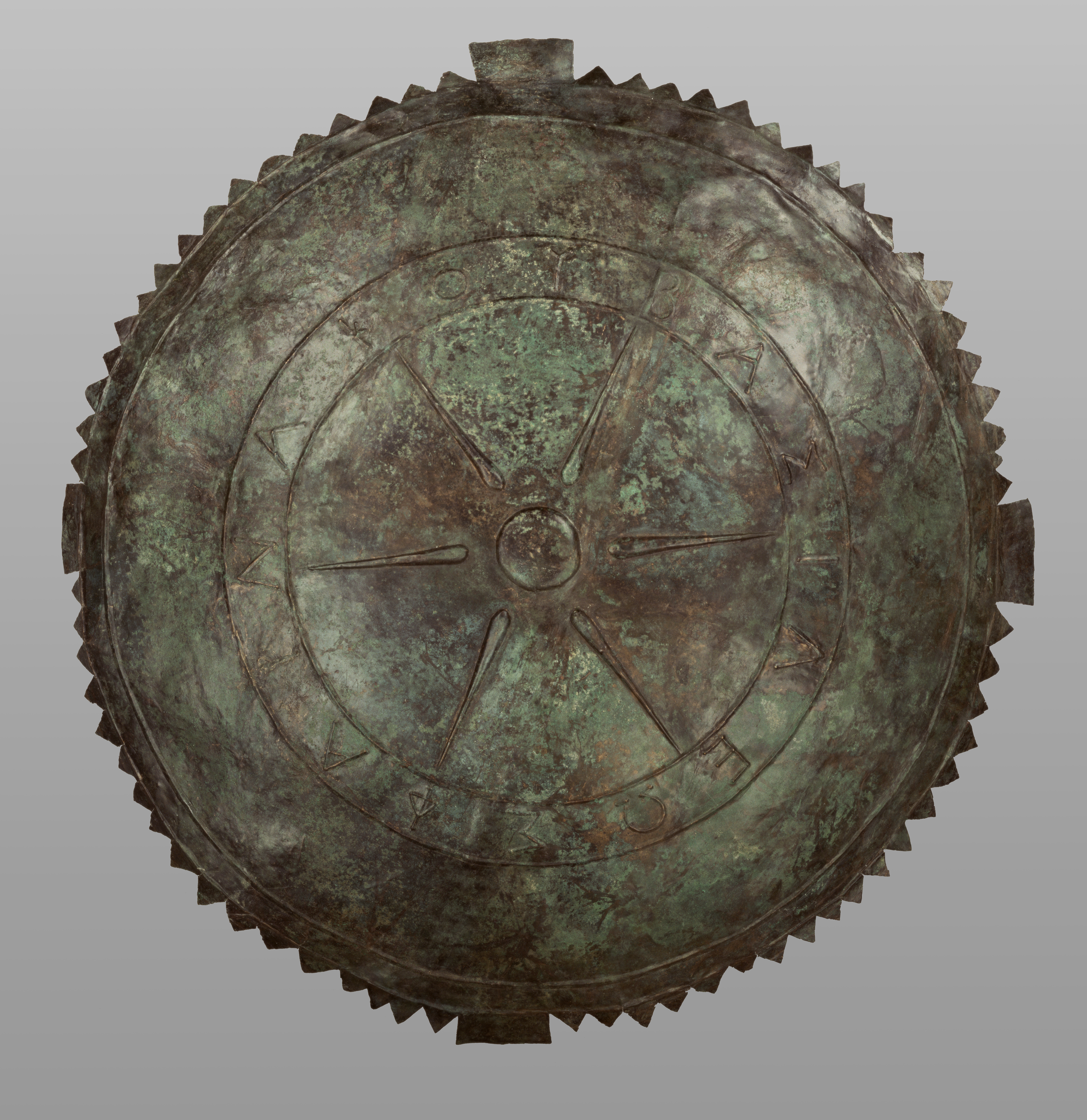
Bronze shield in the name of King Pharnakes, Getty Villa (80.AC.60)

Eumenes II opposed him at the head of an army; but hostilities were soon suspended by the arrival of the Roman deputies, appointed by the Senate to inquire into the matters in dispute. Negotiations were accordingly opened at Pergamon but led to no result, the demands of Pharnaces being rejected by the Romans as unreasonable, and the war was in consequence renewed. It continued, apparently with various interruptions, until the summer of 179 BC, when Pharnaces, finding himself unable to cope with the combined forces of Eumenes II and Ariarathes IV, was compelled to purchase peace with the cession of all his conquests in Galatia and Paphlagonia, with the exception of Sinope.

How long he continued to reign after this we know not; but it appears, from an incidental notice, that he was still on the throne in 170 BC, while he was certainly dead in 154 BC, when his brother Mithridates IV of Pontus is mentioned as King. The Greek historian Polybius accuses Pharnaces of having an arrogant and violent character, siding with the opinion of Eumenes II and the Romans.

== Family ==
Pharnaces married a Seleucid Princess called Nysa, who was the child of queen Laodice IV and king Antiochus IV Epiphanes. Nysa and Pharnaces were related as the parents of Nysa were Pharnaces' first cousins. Pharnaces married Nysa either in 160 BC or 159 BC, through the diplomatic work of the Seleucid King Demetrius I Soter.

Nysa bore Pharnaces two children: a son called Mithridates V of Pontus and a daughter called Nysa of Cappadocia, who is also known as Laodice. Nysa died at an unknown date in the 2nd century BC; she is believed to have died during childbirth.

== Legacy ==
Honorific statues and inscriptions have survived that were dedicated to Pharnaces and Nysa. Pharnaces set about to establish good relations with the citizens of Athens and the Greek island of Delos. Pharnaces made a benefaction to the people of Athens. The exact nature of the benefaction is unknown; Pharnaces may have made some kind of voluntary donation to Athens, possibly soon after 183 BC. A lengthy honorific inscription from the Athenians on Delos honors Pharnaces and Nysa. Pharnaces and Nysa received a crown of gold from them and bronze statues of themselves were set up on Delos. Their lengthy Athenian honorific inscription is dated in the Archonship of the Athenian Tychandros or Tychander which is now generally accepted as 160 BC or 159 BC.

== Sources ==
- B. C. McGing, The foreign policy of Mithridates VI Eupator, King of Pontus, BRILL, 1986
- J. D. Grainger, A Seleukid prosopography and gazetteer, BRILL, 1997
- https://www.livius.org/la-ld/laodice/laodice_iv.html
- Greek Wikipedia article of Nyssa of Pontus

Preceded by Mithridates III	King of Pontus c. 190 BC – c. 155 BC	Succeeded by Mithridates IV
