= Laodicea =

Laodicea (/ˌleɪ.ədɪˈsiːə/) may refer to:

== Places ==
=== Turkey ===
- Laodicea on the Lycus, in Phrygia
- Laodicea Pontica, in the Pontus
- Laodicea Combusta, in Pisidia

=== Syria ===
- Laodicea ad Libanum, near Homs
- Laodicea ad Mare, the present city of Latakia

=== Other countries ===
- Laodicea (Arcadia), in Greece
- Laodicea (Mesopotamia), in Iraq
- Laodicea in Media, former name of Nahavand, Iran
- Laodicea in Phoenicia or Laodicea in Canaan, former names of the ancient city of Berytus, equivalent to modern Beirut, Lebanon

== Biology ==
- Laodicea (cnidarian), a genus of hydrozoans in the suborder Conica

== See also ==
- Laodicean Church, early Christians in Laodicea on the Lycus
- Epistle to the Laodiceans, an apocryphal epistle attributed to Paul the Apostle
- Council of Laodicea, a synod held about 363–364 CE
- A Laodicean, an 1881 novel by Thomas Hardy
- Laodice (disambiguation)
- Ladoceia, a town of ancient Arcadia, Greece
