= Mithridates III of Pontus =

Mithridates III
- Basileus
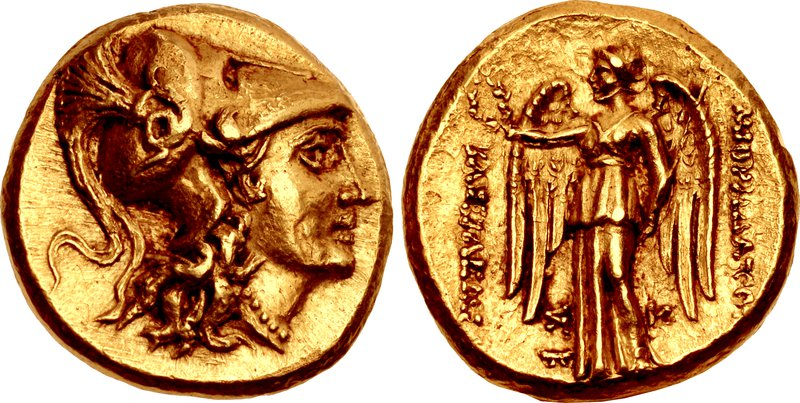
- Coin of Mithridates III of Pontus, minted at Amisos. The reverse portrays Athena.

King of Pontus
- Reign: c. 210 BC – c. 190 BC
- Predecessor: Mithridates II of Pontus
- Successor: Pharnaces I of Pontus
- Spouse: Laodice of Seleucids
- Issue: Pharnaces I of Pontus; Mithridates IV of Pontus; Laodice (sister-wife of Mithridates IV of Pontus)
- Dynasty: Mithridatic dynasty
- Father: Mithridates II of Pontus
- Mother: Laodice (daughter of Antiochus II Theos)

Mithridates III (Greek: Mιθριδάτης) was the fourth king of Pontus, son of Mithridates II of Pontus and Laodice.

Mithridates had two sisters: Laodice III, the first wife of the Seleucid King Antiochus III the Great, and Laodice of Pontus. He may have ruled in an uncertain period between 220 BC and 183 BC. Nothing is known of him since the years just cited, because the kingdom of Pontus disappears from history. His same existence is contested by certain historians, even if it is necessary to account for Appian's indication of Mithridates VI of Pontus as the eighth king of the dynasty and the sixth of the name.

Mithridates married an obscure Seleucid princess called Laodice. By this wife, he had three children: Mithridates IV of Pontus, Pharnaces I of Pontus and Laodice.

== Notes ==
Preceded by Mithridates II	King of Pontus c. 210 BC – c. 190 BC	Succeeded by Pharnaces I
