= Ariobarzanes of Pontus =

King of Pontus
- Reign: 266 BC - 250 BC
- Predecessor: Mithridates I of Pontus
- Successor: Mithridates II of Pontus
- Born: Unknown
- Died: 250 BC (Guess)
- Issue: Mithridates II of Pontus
- Dynasty: Mithridatic
- Father: Mithridates I of Pontus

Ariobarzanes (Greek: Ἀριoβαρζάνης; reigned 266 BC – c. 250 BC) was the second king of Pontus, succeeding his father Mithridates I Ctistes in 266 BC. He died in an uncertain date between 258 and 240 BC.

== Reign ==
He obtained possession of the city of Amastris in Paphlagonia, which was surrendered to him. Ariobarzanes and his father sought the assistance of the Gauls, who had come into Asia Minor twelve years before the death of Mithridates, to expel the Egyptians sent by Ptolemy II Philadelphus. Ariobarzanes was succeeded by Mithridates II.

== Notes ==
Preceded by Mithridates I	King of Pontus; 266–250 BC	Succeeded by Mithridates II
