= Antiochus Hierax =

Separatist leader of Seleucid Asia-Minor

- Basileus
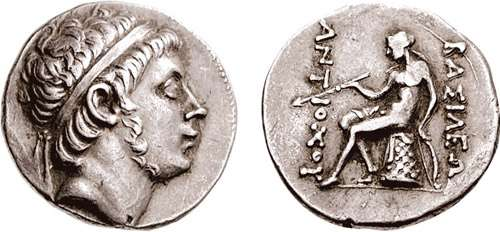
- Coin of Antiochus Hierax. Reverse shows Apollo seated on omphalos. The Greek inscription reads ΒΑΣΙΛΕΩΣ ΑΝΤΙΟΧΟΥ (of king Antiochus).

Usurper King of the Seleucid Empire
- Reign: 240–226 BC
- Predecessor: Antiochus II
- Successor: Attalus I (de facto); Seleucus II (de jure)
- Born: c. 259 BC
- Died: 226 BC; Thrace
- Dynasty: Seleucid dynasty
- Father: Antiochus II Theos
- Mother: Laodice I

Antiochus (/ænˈtaɪ.əkəs/; Ἀντίoχoς; killed c. 226 BC), called Hierax (/ˈhaɪəræks/, Ἱέραξ, "Hawk") for his grasping and ambitious character, was the younger son of Antiochus II and Laodice I and separatist leader in the Hellenistic Seleucid kingdom, who ruled in Asia Minor during his brother's reign.

== Life ==
=== King of Asia Minor ===
Youngest son of Antiochus II and Laodice I, he was thirteen when his father died in 246 BC. That death led to the Third Syrian War. A year later, probably under the influence of his mother, Antiochus demanded possession of Asia Minor from his brother Seleucus II Callinicus and declared his independence in order to expand his territory and his authority. Seleucus, struggling against the Ptolemaic forces, accepted.

=== War of the Brothers ===
In 241 BC, Seleucus made peace with Ptolemy III Euergetes and then tried to recover the territories his brother took from him. Ready for the war, Antiochus sought the help of two strong allies: Mithridates II of Pontus and Ariarathes III of Cappadocia; constituting a vast coalition of Anatolian states: Cappadocia, Bithynia and a certain number of Galatians. After an initial loss in Lydia, Antiochus decimated his brother's army in the Battle of Ancyra in ca. 239 BC and then ruled over Asia Minor, where he produced his own coins. His brother, meanwhile, went east to stop a rebellion in Parthia.

=== Against Attalus I ===
In c. 238, Antiochus and his Galatians allies attacked Pergamon but had to face its powerful ruler Attalus I. Attalus defeated the Gauls and Antiochus at the Battle of Aphrodisium and again at a second battle in the east. Subsequent battles were fought and won against Antiochus alone: in Hellespontine Phrygia, where Antiochus was perhaps seeking refuge with his father-in-law, Ziaelas of Bithynia; near Sardis in the spring of 228 BC; and, in the final battle of the campaign, further south in Caria on the banks of the Harpasus, a tributary of the Maeander. All his possessions taken away, Antiochus still tried to replace his brother in Syria and Mesopotamia, taking advantage of his brother' absence. He ultimately failed and was killed in Thrace in 226 BC.

=== Marriage relations ===
Antiochus Hierax had two wives:

- A daughter of the ruler of Cappadocia (see Ariarathes III of Cappadocia), with whom he was allied at least in 230 BCE.
- A daughter of king of Bithynia, with whom he was also allied.

Both came from royal families whom Hierax allied with against his elder brother Seleucus II.

His sister Laodice was married with his ally, king Mithridates II of Pontus. See also Laodice.
