= Logbasis =

Logbasis (in Greek Λογβασις; killed in 218 BC), a citizen of Selge in Pisidia in Asia Minor. When Selge was attacked by Garsyeris, the general of Achaeus, in 218 BC, Logbasis, as having been guardian to Achaeus' wife Laodice, was deputed by his countrymen to treat with the enemy, and used the opportunity to make a treacherous agreement for the surrender of the city. His design, however, was detected on the very eve of its completion, and his fellow-citizens burst into his house, and slew him, together with his sons and the enemy's soldiers who were secreted there.
