= Mithridates IV of Pontus =

Mithridates IV
- Basileus

King of Pontus
- Reign: before 154 BC – c. 150 BC
- Predecessor: Pharnaces I of Pontus
- Successor: Mithridates V Euergetes
- Co-regent: Laodice
- Died: c. 150 BC
- Spouse: Laodice
- Dynasty: Mithridatic dynasty
- Father: Mithridates III of Pontus
- Mother: Laodice

Mithridates IV of Pontus, sometimes known by his full name Mithridates Philopator Philadelphus, (Greek: Mιθριδάτης ὁ Φιλoπάτωρ Φιλάδελφoς, "Mithridates the father-loving, brother-loving"; died c. 150 BC) was a prince and sixth ruler of the Kingdom of Pontus.

== Biography ==
Mithridates IV was of Persian and Greek Macedonian ancestry. He was born to Mithridates III of Pontus and Laodice. Mithridates IV had two siblings: a brother, Pharnaces I of Pontus, and a sister, Laodice.

Mithridates IV is first mentioned in 179 BC, as he is associated with Pharnaces I in a treaty concluded by Pharnaces I with the King of Pergamon, Eumenes II, in a manner which suggests that he shared some sovereign power. The date of Mithridates’ accession to the Pontian throne is unknown, but he is recorded as the ruler of Pontus in 154 BC, when he is mentioned as sending an auxiliary force to assist the King of Pergamon, Attalus II Philadelphus, against the King of Bithynia, Prusias II. This was an important event as it signalled the start of a policy of friendship between the Kingdom of Pontus and the Roman Republic and her allies which would continue until Mithridates VI Eupator.

At an unknown date, Mithridates IV married his sister, Laodice. They appeared to have no children. His royal title and full name was Mithridates Philopator Philadelphus.

In 1995, a treasure of many gold items, including a royal crown, was accidentally unearthed at Samsun--the old capital of Amisos that served the later Mithridatic dynasty. This Amisos Treasure has been ascribed to the reign of Mithridaes IV, and is now held at a local museum in Samsun.

== Coinage ==
Coinage has survived issued by Mithridates IV alone as well as coins issued with Laodice. The coins issued with his sister-wife display a fine double portrait and they adapted a Ptolemaic model for coinage. The coinage draws attention to his Persian and Greek origins.

An example of a coin on which Mithridates IV honours his Persian origins was one featuring a reverse type of Perseus. This coin could have been issued before he married. Perseus can be seen as a bridge between ancient Greek and Persian cultures. Although Perseus was a Greek hero, he had Persian associations; the Persians regarded him as an Assyrian. Perseus is standing, and wearing a chlamys, pointed curved helmet and winged boots. In his left hand, he holds the harp and his right hand holding the head of Medusa. The star and crescent are also present with his full name. The obverse had a portrait of him alone.

Another coin from his joint rule with his sister-wife highlights his Greek origins. On one side is a draped bust of Mithridates IV and Laodice; on the reverse side, their royal titles in Greek: ΒΑΣΙΛΕΩΣ ΜΙΘΡΑΔΑΤΟΥ ΚΑΙ ΒΑΣΙΛΙΣΣΗΣ ΛΑΟΔΙΚΗΣ ΦΙΛΑΔΕΛΦΩΝ which means of King Mithridates and Queen Laodice Philadelphoi. Philadelphoi is the plural for the Greek word Philadelphus which means sibling-loving. On the side of their royal titles, the coin depicts Mithridates IV and Laodice struck in the image of the Greek patron gods Zeus and Hera, who are standing facing front. Hera is holding a sceptre in her right hand, while Zeus laureate holds a sceptre in his right hand and a thunderbolt in his left. The choice of coinage is a declaration of Hellenism.

== Sources ==
- B.C. McGing, The foreign policy of Mithridates VI Eupator, King of Pontus, BRILL, 1986
- M. Getzel, Hellenistic settlements in Europe, the islands and Asia Minor, Cohen University of California Press, 1995
- Hazel, John; Who's Who in the Roman World, "Mithridates IV", (2002).
- François de Callataÿ, The First Royal Coinage of Pontos (from Mithridates III to Mithridates V)
- Polybius, Histories, xxv. 2
- Polybius, Histories, xxxiii. 12

Preceded by Pharnaces I	King of Pontus c. 155 BC – c. 150 BC	Succeeded by Mithridates V
