= Mithridates Chrestus =

Prince and co-ruler of the Kingdom of Pontus

Mithridates Chrestus (Greek: Μιθριδάτης ό Χρηστός; the Good, flourished 2nd century BC, died 115 BC-113 BC) was a Prince and co-ruler of the Kingdom of Pontus.

Chrestus was of Greek and Persian ancestry. He was the second son and among the children born to the Pontian monarchs Mithridates V of Pontus and Laodice VI. He was born and raised in the Kingdom of Pontus.

His father was assassinated in about 120 BC in Sinope poisoned by unknown persons at a lavish banquet which he held. In the will of his father, Mithridates V left the Kingdom to the joint rule of his mother, his eldest brother Mithridates VI of Pontus and himself. As Chrestus and his brother were underage and thus unable to rule, their mother retained all the power as regent. She favored Chrestus over his elder brother.

In 116 BC/115 BC, Chrestus and his brother were honored by Dionysius, the gymnasiarch on the Greek island of Delos. Another dedication survives in Athens, by a gymnasiarch of statues of Chrestus and his brother to the Greek Patron God Zeus on behalf of Chrestus and his brother apparently in recognition of his aid to sailors and traders.

Mithridates VI escaped from the plotting of his mother and went into hiding. Between 116 BC-113 BC he emerged from hiding, returned to Pontus and was hailed King. He was able to remove his mother and Chrestus from the Pontian throne and become the sole ruler of Pontus. As sole King, Mithridates VI showed clemency towards his mother and brother, by not executing them. He did, however, imprison both of them. Laodice died in prison of natural causes. It is unclear whether Chrestus also died in prison from natural causes or was later tried for treason and then executed on the orders of Mithridates VI. When they died, Mithridates VI gave his mother and brother a royal funeral.

== Sources ==
- Day, J. An Economic History of Athens under Roman Domination, Ayer Publishing, 1942
- Erciyas, D. B. Wealth, Aristocracy and Royal Propaganda under the Hellenistic Kingdom of the Mithradatids in the Central Black Sea Region in Turkey, Brill, 2006
- Mayor, A. The Poison King: the life and legend of Mithradates, Rome’s deadliest enemy, Princeton University Press, 2009
