= Mithridates II of Pontus =

King of Pontos

- Basileus

King of Pontus
- Reign: 250 BC - 210 BC
- Predecessor: Ariobarzanes of Pontus
- Successor: Mithridates III of Pontus
- Spouse: Laodice (Sister of Seleucus II)
- Issue: Laodice III Laodice of Pontus Mithridates III of Pontus
- Dynasty: Mithridatic
- Father: Ariobarzanes of Pontus
- Military career
- Allegiance: Kingdom of Pontus
- Rank: Basileus
- Conflicts: Battle of Ancyra; Conflict with Sinope

Mithridates II (Greek: Mιθριδάτης; lived 3rd century BC), third king of Pontus and son of Ariobarzanes, whom he succeeded on the throne.

== Early life ==
He was a minor when his father died, but the date of his accession cannot be determined. It seems probable that it must have taken place well before 240 BC, as Memnon tells us that he was a child at his father's death, and he had a daughter of marriageable age in 222 BC. Shortly after his accession, his kingdom was invaded by the Gauls, who were eventually repulsed.

After Mithridates attained manhood, he married Laodice, a sister of Antiochus Hierax and Seleucus II Callinicus, with whom he is said to have received the province of Phrygia as a dowry.

== Reign ==
=== Conflict with Seleucus II Callinicus ===
In 245 BCE Antiochus Hierax, supported by his mother Laodice I who held influence in Anatolia, demands the possession of Anatolia (Asia Minor) from his brother Seleucus II Callinicus and quickly declares his independence in order to expand his territory and his authority. Seleucus, struggling against the Ptolemaic forces in the south, has no choice but to tolerate.

Mithridates II fought with his mother-in-law and Hierax and their allies, against his other brother-in-law Seleucus during a war between Seleucus and Antiochus Hierax. Eventually, Mithridates defeated Seleucus in a great battle at Ancyra in 235 BC whereby Seleucus lost twenty thousand of his troops and narrowly escaped with his own life. Hierax died in 226 BCE.

=== Later Reign ===
In 222 BCE, Mithridates II gave his daughter Laodice in marriage to the Seleucid king Antiochus III. Another of his daughters, also named Laodice, was married about the same time to Achaeus, the cousin of Antiochus.

In 220 BC, Mithridates declared war upon the wealthy and powerful city of Sinope. However, he was unable to weaken it and the city did not come under the control of the kings of Pontus until 183 BC.

In 227 BC, Mithridates II vied with the other monarchs of Asia in sending magnificent presents to the Rhodians, after the destruction of their city by an earthquake.

=== Death ===
The date of his death is unknown. He was succeeded by Mithridates III, his son with Laodice.

== Notes ==
Preceded by Ariobarzanes	King of Pontus c. 250 BC – c. 210 BC	Succeeded by Mithridates III
