= Laodice VI =

Greek Seleucid princess, and queen of the Kingdom of Pontus

Laodice VI (Greek: Λαοδίκη ΣΤ΄; died 115–113 BCE) was a Greek Seleucid princess and was queen of the Kingdom of Pontus.

== Biography ==
Laodice was the daughter born from the sibling union of the Seleucid rulers Antiochus IV Epiphanes and Laodice IV, or a more obscure Seleukid relation or impostor. According to the first explanation, her grandparents were Antiochus III the Great and Laodice III. Through her mother’s previous marriages, she had various maternal half-brothers and sisters and two full blooded brothers who served as Seleucid kings Antiochus V Eupator and Alexander Balas. In 152 BC, Laodice became one of the supporters for her brother Alexander Balas, who revolted and overthrew the Seleucid king Demetrius I Soter, who was their maternal half-brother/cousin.

The other alternative is Laodice appears to have come from obscure origins, connected with the same impostorship as Alexander Balas. Laodice could have been a supposed daughter of the Seleucid King Antiochus IV Epiphanes. This is based on the assumption that the sister of Alexander Balas who appeared in Rome with him in 153 BC as a genuine daughter of Antiochus IV Epiphanes was the Laodice who married Mithridates V. Antiochus IV Epiphanes had two daughters who were Laodice VI from this marriage to his sister-wife Laodice IV and his other daughter was Antiochis the child from his concubine. However this assumption shows that Antiochus IV Epiphanes may have had another daughter called Laodice, however this is not certain. The assumption shows that there could some confusion about the identity of this Laodice VI.

After 152 BC, Laodice married King Mithridates V of Pontus, who reigned from 150–120 BC. Mithridates V and Laodice VI were related, as her husband had lineage from the Seleucid dynasty. Little is known regarding her relationship with her husband or her reign as Pontian queen. During their marriage, Laodice bore Mithridates V seven children: Laodice (I) (by marriage Queen consort of Cappadocia), Mithridates VI of Pontus, Mithridates Chrestus, Laodice (II) (by marriage Queen consort of Pontus), Nysa (sometimes spelt as Nyssa), Roxana and Statira. Nysa, Roxana and Statira were put to death after the fall of the Kingdom of Pontus in 63 BC.

Mithridates V was assassinated in about 120 BC in Sinope poisoned by unknown persons at a lavish banquet which he held. In the will of Mithridates V, he left the kingdom to the joint rule of Laodice, Mithridates VI and Mithridates Chrestus. Both of her sons were underage to rule and Laodice retained all power as regent.

Laodice in her regency favored her second son over her first son. During her regency 120–116 BC (even perhaps up to 113 BC), Mithridates VI escaped from the plotting of his mother and had gone into hiding. She enjoyed luxuries that made her a compliant client of Rome. She accepted bribes from the Roman Republic and her extravagance pushed Pontus into debt.

Mithridates VI between 116–113 BC returned to Pontus from hiding and was hailed king. He was able to remove his mother and his brother from the Pontian throne, thus Mithridates VI became the sole ruler of Pontus. Mithridates VI show clemency towards his mother and brother, by imprisoning them both. Laodice VI died in prison of natural causes, however his brother Mithridates Chrestus could have died in prison from natural causes or was tried for treason and was executed on the orders of his brother. When they died, Mithridates VI gave his mother and brother a royal funeral.

== Sources ==
- Walbank, W. The Cambridge ancient history: The Hellenistic world, Volume 7 F. Cambridge University Press, 1984
- Mayor, A. The Poison King: the life and legend of Mithradates, Rome’s deadliest enemy, Princeton University Press, 2009
- https://www.livius.org/la-ld/laodice/laodice_vi.html
- https://www.livius.org/la-ld/laodice/laodice_vi.html
- https://web.archive.org/web/20160303204408/http://www.pontos.dk/publications/books/bss-9-files/bss-9-07-hojte-2
