= Laodice of Pontus =

Princess of Pontus

Laodice (in Greek Λαοδικη; lived in the 3rd century BC), was a princess of Pontus and was one of the daughters of Mithridates II of Pontus and Laodice. Her sister was Laodice III, the first wife of Antiochus III the Great, and her brother was Mithridates III of Pontus. She married her distant maternal cousin, the Seleucid general Achaeus. When Achaeus fell into the power of Antiochus III (213 BC), Laodice was left in possession of the citadel of Sardis, in which she held out for a time, but she was quickly compelled by the dissensions among her own troops to surrender to Antiochus III. Polybius incidentally mentions that she was brought up before her marriage at Selge, in Pisidia, under the care of Logbasis, a citizen of that place.
