= Laodice (wife of Mithridates II of Pontus) =

Ancient Greek princess of the 3rd century BC

Laodice (Greek: Λαοδίκη; flourished 3rd century BC) was a Greek Princess of the Seleucid Empire.

== Life ==
She was one of the daughters and youngest child born to the Seleucid Monarchs Antiochus II Theos and Laodice I. Among her siblings were her brothers Seleucus II Callinicus and Antiochus Hierax. Laodice was born and raised in the Seleucid Empire.

Somewhere between 245 BC to 239 BC, her mother and Seleucus II arranged for her to marry King Mithridates II of Pontus. Laodice married Mithridates II, as a part of a political alliance between the Seleucid Empire and the Kingdom of Pontus. In 245 BC, her mother and Seleucus II were in the Third Syrian War. To gain support from the Kingdom of Pontus, Laodice was given to Mithridates II in marriage and as a marriage gift, Phrygia was transferred as well.

Through her marriage Laodice became Queen of Pontus. Mithridates’ marriage to Laodice was one of the most important events of his reign and was an ambitious marriage policy he initiated. Through his political alliance and marriage to Laodice, Mithridates II allied himself to the most important royal house in Asia, gaining impressive recognition for Pontus as a political power in the Hellenistic world. This marriage also strengthened the pro-Seleucid orientation of Pontus foreign policy.

The marriage occurred early in the reign of Seleucus II Callinicus, so he could secure Anatolia behind him, so that Seleucus II could turn his attention to war with the Egyptian Greek Pharaoh Ptolemy III Euergetes. At some point, Laodice may have influenced Mithridates II by her desire to weaken the Seleucid state, by supporting her first brother Seleucus II Callinicus in joint rule with her other brother Antiochus Hierax, who were at civil war with each other. Laodice bore Mithridates II three children, two daughters: Laodice III, Laodice of Pontus and a son Mithridates III of Pontus.

== Sources ==
- ""Laodice" - Livius". Livius.org.
- "Antiochus II Theos - Livius". Livius.org. Archived from the original on 22 September 2016.
- BC. McGing, The foreign policy of Mithridates VI Eupator, King of Pontus, BRILL, 1986, ISBN 978-9004075917
