= List of monarchs of Pontus =

This is a list of monarchs of Pontus, an ancient Hellenistic kingdom of Persian origin in Asia Minor.

== Monarchs of Pontus ==
Name	Reign
Mithridates I Ktistes	281 - 266 BCE
Ariobarzanes	266 - c. 250 BCE
Mithridates II	c. 250 - c. 220 BCE
Mithridates III	c. 220 - c. 185 BCE
Pharnaces I	c. 185 – c. 170 BCE
Mithridates IV Philopator Philadephos	c. 170 – c. 150 BCE
Laodice, co-regent of Mithridates IV	c. 170 – c. 150 BCE
Mithridates V Euergetes	c. 150 – 120 BCE
Mithridates VI Eupator	120–63 BCE
Pharnaces II	63–47 BCE
Darius	39–37 BCE
Arsaces	37 BCE
Polemon I	37–8 BCE
Pythodorida	8 BCE – 38 CE
Polemon II	38 - 62 CE
