= Laoticus =

Laoticus may refer to:

- Amorphophallus laoticus, a tropical plant species of the Amorphophallus genus
- Croton laoticus, sometimes called Rushfoil, trees or shrubs of the Croton (plant)
- Heterometrus laoticus, an Asian forest scorpion
