= Laodice (sister-wife of Mithridates IV of Pontus) =

Princess and Queen of the Kingdom of Pontus

- Basilissa

Queen of Pontus
- Reign: c. 162 BC – c. 150s BC
- Predecessor: Pharnaces I of Pontus
- Successor: Mithridates V Euergetes
- Co-regent: Mithridates IV of Pontus
- Spouse: Mithridates IV of Pontus
- Dynasty: Mithridatic dynasty
- Father: Mithridates III of Pontus
- Mother: Laodice

Laodice (flourished 2nd century BC) was a princess and queen of the Kingdom of Pontus, married to her brother Mithridates IV of Pontus. Numismatic evidence makes it likely that Laodice was co-regent with Mithridates IV.

== Life ==
Laodice was of Greek Macedonian and Persian ancestry. She was the daughter of Laodice and Mithridates III of Pontus. Her brothers were Mithridates IV of Pontus and Pharnaces I of Pontus who reigned as Kings of Pontus after the death of their parents. Laodice was born and raised in the Kingdom of Pontus.

=== Queen ===
The ancient sources do not mention anything about Laodice. She is only known through surviving coins, statues and inscriptions. At some point, Laodice married her brother Mithridates IV of Pontus. She appears to have had no children with her husband.

Surviving coins that were issued by Laodice, and coins that were jointly issued by her and Mithridates IV, show that she reigned as Queen of Pontus with her brother sometime between around 162 BC and the 150s BC. From the coinage, it appears very likely that Laodice was co-regent with Mithridates IV. Coins from the joint reign of Laodice and Mithridates IV display a fine double portrait, and they adapted a Ptolemaic model for coinage.

An example of a coin from their joint reign shows on the obverse side a draped bust of Mithridates IV and Laodice. The reverse side shows their royal titles in Greek: ΒΑΣΙΛΕΩΣ ΜΙΘΡΑΔΑΤΟΥ ΚΑΙ ΒΑΣΙΛΙΣΣΗΣ ΛΑΟΔΙΚΗΣ ΦΙΛΑΔΕΛΦΩΝ, which means "of King Mithridates and Queen Laodice Philadelphoi". Philadelphoi is the nominative plural of the Greek word philadelphos which means "sibling-loving". On the side of their royal titles, presents Mithridates IV and Laodice struck in the image of the Greek Patron Gods Zeus and Hera. Zeus and Hera are standing facing front. Hera is holding a sceptre in the right hand, while Zeus laureate holds a sceptre in his right hand and a thunderbolt in his left hand. The choice of coinage is a declaration of Hellenism.

On the coins she issued herself, her royal title in Greek on coinage is ΒΑΣΙΛΙΣΣΗΣ ΛΑΟΔΙΚΗΣ, which means "of Queen Laodice". Other silver coins in her issue have her royal titled initialled. One coin she issued has a veiled bust of her on the obverse: on the reverse is her royal Greek title with her being struck in the image of Hera. Hera is standing facing front; she wears a long dress and holds a sceptre in her right hand.

On another coin she issued, she appears on the obverse as a veiled bust, and on the reverse having her Greek royal title ΒΑΣΙΛΙΣΣΗΣ ΛΑΟΔΙΚΗΣ - ΕΠΙΘΑΝΟΥ ΚΑΙ ΦΙΛΑΔΕΛΦΟΥ which means "of Queen Laodice illustrious and sibling-loving". On the side of her royal title is a double cornucopia and a six-rayed star. Laodice is the only queen with the epithet ἐπιφᾰνής (epiphanes) on a Greek coin. She was honored with a statue and an inscription on the Greek island of Delos.

According to the surviving evidence, Laodice was a well-connected figure and perhaps well known in ancient Greek and Persian societies. She appears to have been a royal of some influence and distinction, and may have had considerable power. She seems to have been religious, patriotic of her Greek and Persian ancestry, who ruled justly and fairly for both societies.

== Sources ==
- McGing, B. C. (1986). The Foreign Policy of Mithridates VI Eupator, King of Pontus. BRILL. ISBN 978-90-04-07591-7.
- M. Getzel, Hellenistic settlements in Europe, the islands and Asia Minor, Cohen University of California Press, 1995
- The First Royal Coinage of Pontos (from Mithridates III to Mithridates V), Francois de Callatay
- The Dynastic History of the Hellenistic Monarchies of Asia Minor According to Chorography of George Synkellos by Oleg L. Gabelko
