= Mithridates I of Pontus =

3rd century BC Persian nobleman and founder of the Kingdom of Pontus

Mithridates I of Pontus Mithridates III of Cius
- Basileus

King of Pontus
- Reign: 281 BC - 266 BC
- Predecessor: (Creator of Title)
- Successor: Ariobarzanes of Pontus

Ruler of Cius
- Predecessor: Mithridates II of Cius
- Successor: None
- Born: Mid 330s BC
- Died: 266 BC
- Issue: Ariobarzanes of Pontus
- Dynasty: Mithridatic
- Father: Mithridates II of Cius
- Military career
- Allegiance: Kingdom of Pontus
- Rank: Basileus
- Conflicts: Conflict with the Ptolemaic Kingdom

Mithridates I Ctistes (Greek: Mιθριδάτης Kτίστης; reigned 281–266 BC), also known as Mithridates III of Cius, was a Persian nobleman and the founder (this is the meaning of the word Ctistes, literally Builder) of the Kingdom of Pontus in Anatolia.

== Biography ==
Mithridates is said to have been of the same age as Demetrios Poliorketes, which means he was born in the mid-330s BC. In 302 or 301 BC, shortly after having executed the young man's father and predecessor Mithridates II of Cius, the diadoch Antigonus became suspicious of the son who had inherited the family dominion of Cius, and planned to kill the boy. Mithridates, however, received from Demetrius Poliorketes timely notice of Antigonus's intentions, and fled with a few followers to Paphlagonia, where he occupied a strong fortress, called Cimiata.

He was joined by numerous bodies of troops from different quarters and gradually extended his dominions in Pontus and created the foundations for the birth of a new kingdom, which may be judged to have risen about 281 BC when Mithridates assumed the title of basileus (king). In the same year, we find him concluding an alliance with the town of Heraclea Pontica in Bithynia, to protect it against Seleucus.

At a subsequent period, Mithridates is found acquiring support from the Gauls (who later settled in Asia Minor) in order to overthrow a force sent against him by Ptolemy, king of Ptolemaic Egypt. These are the recorded events of his reign, which lasted for thirty-six years. He was succeeded by his son Ariobarzanes. He seems to have been buried in a royal grave near the kingdom's capital, Amasia. Next to him would be buried all the kings of Pontus until the fall of Sinope in 183 BC.

According to Appian, he was eighth in descent from the first satrap of Pontus under Darius the Great and sixth in ascending order from Mithridates Eupator. However, this point is controversial since Plutarch writes that eight generations of kings of Pontus stemmed from him before Roman subjection.

== Notes ==
Preceded by –	King of Pontus; 281–266 BC	Succeeded by Ariobarzanes
