= Laodice IV =

- Head Priestess of the Seleucid Empire

Queen consort of the Seleucid Empire
- Tenure: 196–193 BC (with Laodice III)
- Predecessor: Laodice III
- Successor: Laodice III

Queen consort of the Seleucid Empire
- Tenure: 187–175 BC
- Predecessor: Euboea
- Successor: Herself

Queen consort of the Seleucid Empire
- Tenure: 175–163 BC
- Predecessor: Herself
- Successor: Unknown (Antiochus V Eupator unmarried, consort of Timarchus unknown)
- Born: Seleucid Empire
- Spouse: Antiochus; Seleucus IV Philopator; Antiochus IV Epiphanes
- Issue: Nysa; Antiochus; Demetrius I Soter; Laodice V; Antiochus V Eupator; Laodice VI
- Dynasty: Seleucid
- Father: Antiochus III the Great
- Mother: Laodice III
- Occupation: Priestess

Laodice IV (flourished second half 3rd century BC and first half 2nd century BC) was a Greek princess, head priestess and a queen of the Seleucid Empire. Antiochus III appointed Laodice in 193 BC, as the chief priestess of the state cult dedicated to her mother Laodice III in Media. She later was married to three kings of the Seleucid Empire --all her brothers.

== Biography ==
=== Family and early life ===
She was one of the daughters and among the children born to the Seleucid Monarchs Antiochus III the Great and Laodice III. Her paternal grandparents were the former Seleucid Monarchs Seleucus II Callinicus and Laodice II, while her maternal grandparents were King Mithridates II of Pontus and his wife Laodice.

The parents of Laodice IV were first cousins, because her paternal grandfather and her maternal grandmother were brother and sister, and were among the children of Antiochus II Theos and Laodice I. She was born and raised in the Seleucid Empire. Laodice was commemorated with an honorific inscription dedicated to her at Delos.

=== First tenure as queen consort ===
In 196 BC, her eldest brother, crown prince Antiochus, was appointed by her father to succeed him. In that year Laodice was married to him. The marriage of Laodice IV and Antiochus was the first sibling marriage to occur in the Seleucid dynasty. From their sibling union Laodice IV bore Antiochus a daughter called Nysa. Antiochus III appointed Laodice in 193 BC as the chief priestess of the state cult dedicated to her mother Laodice III in Media. Later that year, her brother-husband died. The family, particularly Antiochus III, grieved his death.

=== Second marriage ===
Antiochus III arranged for her to marry again, this time to her second eldest brother Seleucus IV Philopator. In their union, they had three children: two sons, Antiochus and Demetrius I Soter, and a daughter named Laodice V. In 187 BC, Antiochus III died and Seleucus IV succeeded their father. He became the Seleucid King while Laodice IV became the Seleucid Queen. They reigned as the Seleucid imperial couple from 187 BC until 175 BC, when Seleucus IV died. There is no surviving record on how Laodice IV reigned as queen or how her contemporaries viewed her. Briefly in 175 BC, Laodice's first son was King. There are surviving coins dating from 175 BC that show portraits of Laodice IV and her first son with Seleucus IV, Antiochus, making them the first Seleucid King and Queen depicted on coins.

=== Third marriage ===
After the death of Seleucus IV, Laodice married for the third time her youngest brother Antiochus IV Epiphanes, who succeeded his second eldest brother as King. Antiochus IV co-ruled with his nephew Antiochus and adopted him as his son, but had him assassinated in 170 BC. Laodice bore Antiochus IV two children: a son, Antiochus V Eupator, and a daughter, Laodice VI. When Laodice's youngest brother and first son co-ruled, her second son Demetrius I Soter was sent as a political hostage to Rome. When Antiochus IV died, the first son of Laodice IV and Antiochus IV, Antiochus V Eupator succeeded his father as Seleucid King.

== See also ==
- List of Syrian monarchs
- Timeline of Syrian history

Laodice IV Seleucid dynasty Born: Unknown Died: Unknown
Royal titles
Preceded by Consort of Laodice III	Seleucid Queen (Queen Consort of Syria); 196–193 BC with Antiochus (210–193 BC)	Succeeded by Laodice III
Preceded by Euboea	Seleucid Queen (Queen Consort of Syria); 187–163 BC with Seleucus IV Philopator (187–175 BC); Antiochus IV Epiphanes (175–163 BC)	Succeeded by None (or consort of Timarchus)
