= Laodice III =

Queen consort of the Seleucid Empire
- Tenure: c. 222 BC – c. 191 BC
- Coronation: c. 222 BC (ceremony at Zeugma)
- Died: after 176 BC
- Spouse: Antiochus III the Great
- Issue more...: Antiochus; Seleucus IV Philopator; Laodice IV; Cleopatra I Syra; Antiochis; Antiochus IV Epiphanes
- Dynasty: Mithridatic
- Father: Mithridates II of Pontus
- Mother: Laodice

Laodice III (Greek: Λαοδίκη, Laodikē) also known as Laodika, was a princess of Pontus and a Seleucid queen. She was regent for her first born son, Antiochus, during the Anabase expedition of her husband, Antiochus III the Great, between 212 and 206 BC. Antiochus III created a royal cult dedicated to her in 193 BC. In 192 BC she was pushed out of political life due to her husband's remarriage. Her last known activities are documented in 177–176 BC and relate to the court of her son, Seleucus IV.

== Biography ==
She was a daughter of King Mithridates II of Pontus and his wife Laodice. Her sister was Laodice of Pontus and her brother was Mithridates III of Pontus.

Laodice married Antiochus III around 221 BC in a ceremony at Zeugma and named queen at Antioch. Polybius states that she was promised to Antiochus III as “a virgin and aforenamed as wife to the king”. The fact that her parents named her ‘Laodice’ in the Seleucid female tradition suggests that her parents intended this marriage from her birth, and named her accordingly. Like her sisters, her marriage was part of a diplomatic strategy to strengthen relations between the Seleucids and Pontus.

Laodice gave birth to her eldest child, Antiochus, while her husband Antiochus III set out his expedition against Molon. During her marriage, it is believed that Laodice and her children sometimes followed Antiochus during his expeditions throughout his empire.

Laodice III bore Antiochus III eight children who were: Antiochus, Seleucus IV Philopator, Ardys, a daughter, name unknown, who was engaged to Demetrius I of Bactria, Laodice IV, Cleopatra I Syra, Antiochis and Antiochus IV Epiphanes (birth name Mithridates).

Many inscriptions refer to Laodice as the “sister” or “sister-queen” of Antiochus III, and Laodice often referred to Antiochus as “brother”, despite the fact that the couple were only maternal first cousins. This was not an official title, but used for multiple reasons; it played up to attributions of loyalty and devoted like-mindedness of the couple, as well as affirming Laodice's position as a member of the dynasty, and her position as being an equal to her husband. Towns could use the term “sister-queen” to further praise Laodice as a faithful consort. Furthermore, Laodice's position as ‘sister’ to Antiochus mimicked the traditions of the previous Hecatomnid dynasty that ruled Caria during the 4th century BC, integrating the Seleucids into that territory's traditions. This practice was also borrowed from the Greek world, where Ptolemy II's marriage to his full sister was likened to the divine union of Zeus and Hera, and started a tradition of representing wives as sisters in the Ptolemaic dynasty.

Laodice and Antiochus furthered the tradition of brother-sister rulers by arranging the marriage of two of their own children, Antiochus and Laodice, in 195 BC.

In 192 BC Antiochus took a second wife, Euboea of Chalcis, which led to Laodice being pushed to the periphery of Antiochus' court. It has been suggested that Laodice was repudiated by Antiochus in favour of his new wife, but there is no evidence for this. Although Antiochus' second wife did not have the political influence of Laodice, Laodice disappears from the public record until after the death of Antiochus.

== Political power ==
=== Regency ===
In 210 BC, Antiochus, the king's eldest son, was made co-ruler with his father, at the age of 10 or 11 years old, in order to keep the throne secure while Antiochus III went on campaign in the east. During this time Laodice most probably acted as regent. A clay seal impression is thought to show Antiochus the son in the foreground, with Laodice in the background, suggesting that she overtly displayed her power as ruler during her regency.

The royal cult that Antiochus III initiated in 195 BC may have been a way for Antiochus to acknowledge Laodice for her good management of the kingdom during his absences.

=== Benefactor ===
During and after her regency, Laodice continued to assert her political power by acting as a benefactor, or philanthropist. Philanthropic action was typical of Hellenistic queens as a way to further their power and assert their position, particularly in the religious sphere, but Laodice was unusually active and her donations addressed political problems and targeted depopulation and poverty by focusing on food and marriage. Laodice's donations are evidenced in inscriptions of her honours, and her letters to the towns.

In Sardis, Antiochus had imposed a tax of 5%, attached a billeted garrison and confiscated the gymnasium after the citizens of Sardis' resistance to him in 214 BC. However, in 213 BC, these punishments were greatly lessened, with a 3-year tax exemption, the donation of wood from the royal forest, the restoration of the gymnasium and a donation of 8000 litres of oil for the youths at the gymnasium. Some historians suggest that these actions may have been thanks to the influence of Laodice, as she is particularly honoured in the inscriptions following the donations.

In Teos in 203 BC, Laodice was thanked for helping the city, alongside her husband. The similarity of honours accorded to Laodice at Teos and at Iasos suggest that she acted as a benefactor in a similar manner.

The city of Iasos had suffered the loss of its freedom and traditional laws, as well as depopulation, poverty, and an earthquake. In 196 BC Laodice donated 10000 medimnus of wheat, the profits of which were to be used to ensure each woman getting married had a dowry of three hundred Antiochian drachmai. The funding for this came from land that belonged to Laodice, but her use of Strouthiôn, a royal administrator, suggests she did this acting as part of the royal administration rather than as a separate body.

== Honors ==
=== Civic Honors ===
For her help, Laodice received multiple honours, which often focused on honouring her symbolically as a mother. It is not always clear if these honors were given before or after her benefaction of the city. The cities could have given them after in order to honour and thank the queen (probable in Sardis) or it could have been given before, in order to encourage the queen to act generously towards the city (possible in Teos). The giving of honours was the point of depart for a diplomatic exchange, in which the queen would be obliged by laws of exchange to accept the honours and act as a sort of patron to the city. As she received more honours, the cities honoured her in increasingly elaborate manners.

In Sardis, an altar was made and dedicated to Laodice, and there was an annual festival with a sacrifice for the queen, king and children. These festivities were related to Zeus.

In Teos, statues were built of both the king and the queen in the temple of Dionysos. There were sacrifices made to the king and queen during an annual celebration, Antiocheia Kai Laodikeia, with a banquet dedicated to the royal couple. Foreign residents were also expected to hold their own sacrifice at home. An agora was built in the port with a fountain dedicated to Laodice, the water of which was to be used for civic sacrifices, funeral rituals, and bathwater for brides to be. In order to draw the water, one would need to dress all in white and wear a crown. The honours were meant to be “for the rest of time” but stopped after 189 BC when Antiochus was defeated by the Romans leading to the Treaty of Apamea.

In Iasos Laodice was linked to Aphrodite, who represented sex, maternity and marriage. There was a religious festival on the birthday of the queen, in the month of Aphrodision, during which there would be a procession of the betrothed, dressed in white. Annually, a virgin girl was elected from a high status family, and named priestess of Laodice. Later, these honours included funds that were dedicated to female education, connecting Laodice with education and the introduction of female citizens into public life. These honours were to continue for 10 years, but ceased after 189 BC.

=== Royal Cult ===
In 192 BC, more than 10 years after his return from conquest, Antiochus III declared a cult dedicated to Laodice. He had already created a cult for himself in 209 BC, and this new cult was envisioned as a parallel to his own cult, with priestesses which mirrored his priests. Although the existence of previous honours helped in the development of the royal cult, they could not compete with the glamour of royal administrative festivities. A royal cult was modelled on the worship of the gods, with a sacrifice, a procession of citizens wearing wreaths and their best clothes, and then competitions. A priestess of the cult of Laodice was named in each city. In Nehavend, Laodice, daughter of Antiochus III and Laodice III was named the priestess of the cult of Laodice III, in order to help introduce her into her public role, and advance her position as consort and co-ruler with their son Antiochus. In Caria, Berenice, of the Telmessus dynasty was named high priestess in order to further relations between the Seleucids and local dynasties, and unify the kingdom. Other priestesses also came primarily from local dynasties and the royal family, though some historians theorise that the use of local dynasties may have been somewhat due to the fact that most Seleucid women were not available to be high priestesses, as they were involved in state marriages to neighbouring kings. Although the cult came quite a bit later than Laodice's regency, Antiochus claimed he started the cult in order to celebrate the virtue of Laodice and her piety. This has led historians to interpret the cult as a way of recognising Laodice for her management of the kingdom during the absence of the king. An alternative view is that the cult was started at a moment of weakness in the Seleucid Empire, and was useful in promoting unity throughout the empire.

Rather than include the cult in legal acts, or writing to local governors (satraps) to spread the cult, Antiochus III wrote directly to the satraps to spread the cult, such as Anaximbrotos in Phrygia and Menedemos in the east. Some historians have interpreted this as a lack of interest on the part of Antiochus III. After Antiochos’ remarriage, Antiochus ceased his efforts to further the official cult of Laodice.

Seleucus IV may have perpetuated further honours related to Laodice by associating her with the goddess Nikephoros-Aphrodite around 177 BCE, due to the relationship of Aphrodite to queens and the appearance of bronzes depicting the goddess around the possible time of Laodice's death. The royal children may have been moved to assert the sacredness of Laodice and her position as queen due to the second marriage by Antiochus.

== See also ==
- List of Syrian monarchs
- Timeline of Syrian history

== Sources ==
- Austin, M. “The Seleukids and Asia.” In A Companion to the Hellenistic World, ed. A. Erskin, Oxford, Blackwell Publishing, 2003: 121-133.
- Beilman, A. Femmes en public dans le monde hellénistique, Malesherbes, Sedes, 2002.
- Capdetrey, L. Le pouvoir séleucide: Territoire, administration, finances d’un royaume hellénistique (312-129 avant J.-C.), Rennes : Presses Universitaires de Rennes, 2007.
- Chaniotis, A. “The Divinity of Hellenistic Rulers.” In A Companion to the Hellenistic World, ed. A. Erskin, Oxford, Blackwell Publishing, 2003: 431-445.
- Gauthier, P. Les Cités Grecques et leurs Bienfaiteurs (Ive-Ier siècle avant J.-C.), Paris, École Français d’Athènes, 1985.
- Gauthier, P. Nouvelles Inscriptions de Sardes II, Hautes études du Monde Gréco-Romain, Droz, Genève, 1989.
- Iossif P., Lober, C. “Laodikai and the Goddess Nikephoros.” Archived 2024-12-08 at the Wayback Machine L’antiquité classique, Tome 76, 2007 : 63-88.
- Ma, J. Antiochos III et les Cités de l’Asie Mineure Occidentale, trad. S. Bardet, Paris, Les Belles Lettres, 2004.
- Polybius, Histories, Evelyn S. Shuckburgh (translator), London - New York, (1889)
- Ramsey, G. “The Queen and the City: Royal Female Intervention and Patronage in Hellenistic Civic Communities.” Gender & History, Vol 23, No. 3, 2011: 510-527.
- Rowlandson, J., Takahashi, R. “Brother-Sister Marriage and Inheritance Strategies in Greco-Roman Egypt.” Journal of Roman Studies, vol. 99 (2009):104-139.
- Smith, William (editor); Dictionary of Greek and Roman Biography and Mythology, "Laodice (4)", Boston, (1867) (link no longer active)
- https://www.livius.org/am-ao/antiochus/antiochus_iii.html Archived 2016-12-05 at the Wayback Machine
- John D. Grainger, A Seleukid prosopography and gazetteer, BRILL, 1997

Laodice III Seleucid dynasty Born: Unknown Died: c. 176 BC
Royal titles
Preceded by Consort of Seleucus III Ceraunus. Last known:Laodice II	Seleucid Queen (Queen Consort of Syria) c. 222 BC – c. 191 BC with Antiochus III the Great (222–187 BC)	Succeeded by Euboea
