= Laodice (wife of Mithridates III of Pontus) =

Laodice (fl. late 3rd – early 2nd centuries BC) was a Greek Princess from the Seleucid Empire and the wife of King Mithridates III of Pontus. Mithridates III and Laodice had three children: Pharnaces I of Pontus, Mithridates IV of Pontus, and Laodice.

It has been proposed that Laodice, wife of Mithridates III, was a daughter of the Seleucid King Antiochus IV Epiphanes., However, Mithradates III died before Antiochos IV had children. This proposition is based on the assumption that the sister of Alexander Balas who appeared in Rome with him in 153 BC as a genuine daughter of Antiochus IV Epiphanes was also the Laodice who married Mithridates III. Laodice, sister of Alexander Balas, may have married Mithridates V. The background of the Mithridates III's wife remains unknown.

== See also ==
- List of Syrian monarchs
- Timeline of Syrian history

== Sources ==
- M. Getzel, Hellenistic settlements in Europe, the islands and Asia Minor, Cohen University of California Press, 1995
- J.D. Grainger, A Seleukid prosopography and gazetteer, BRILL 1997
- https://www.livius.org/la-ld/laodice/laodice_iv.html
- The First Royal Coinage of Pontos (from Mithridates III to Mithridates V), Francois de Callatay
