= Kingdom of Pontus =

281 BC–62 AD kingdom in northern Anatolia

- 281 BC–62 AD
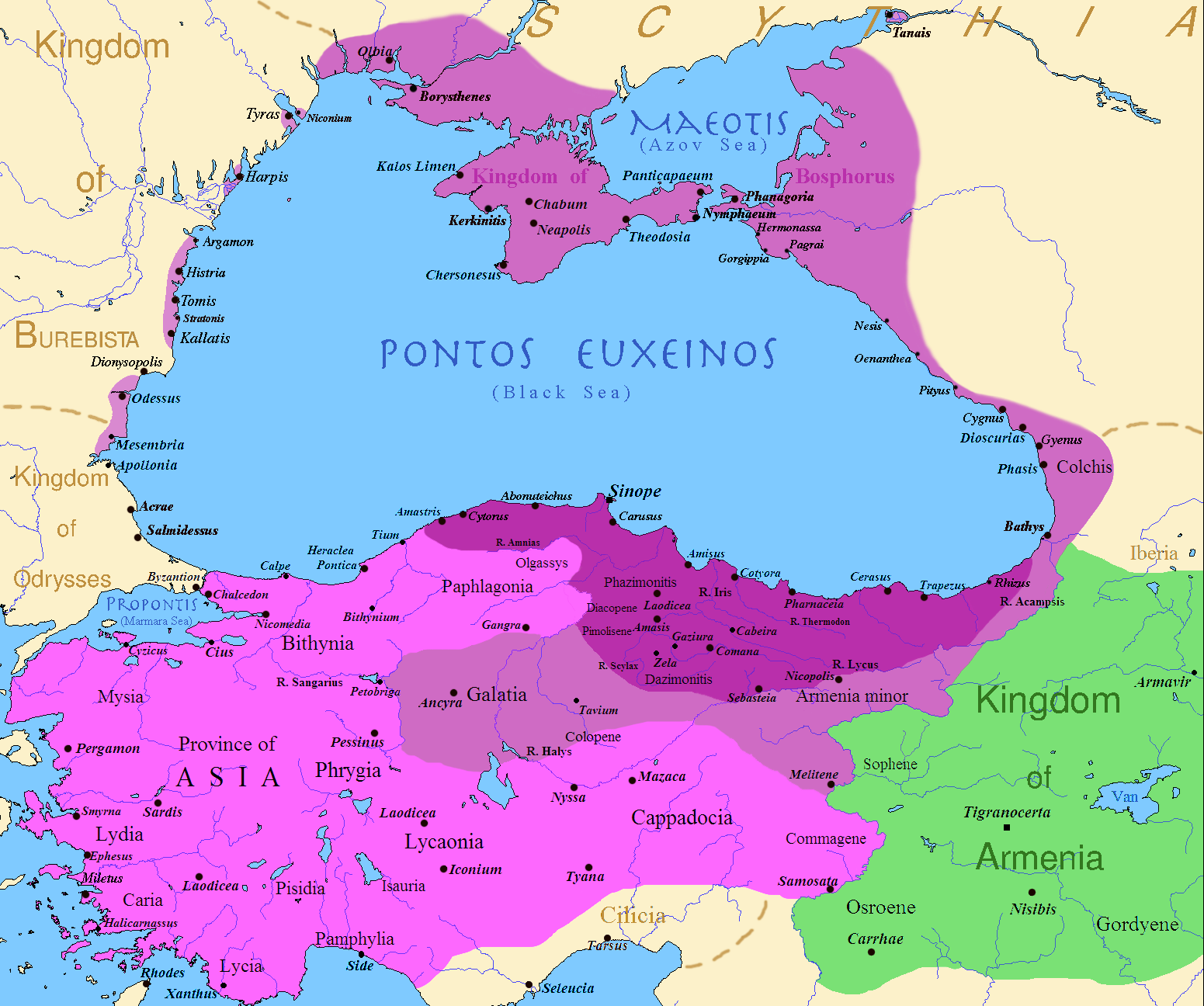
- The Pontic empire at its height: before the reign of Mithridates VI (dark purple), after his early conquests (purple), and his conquests in the first Mithridatic War (pink)
- Status: Independent kingdom (281 – 63 BC); Client kingdom of the Roman Republic and Roman Empire (eastern part of the kingdom; 63 BC – 62 AD)
- Capital: Amaseia, Sinope; 40°39′00″N 35°50′00″E
- Common languages: Koine Greek (official after 3rd century BC), Ionic Greek (in coastal cities), Persian (dynastic), Armenian (after 115 BC) and Anatolian (regional)
- Religion: Syncretic Hellenistic religion, incorporating Greek polytheism, Iranian religion, and local Anatolian religion.
- Government: Monarchy
- Basileus
  - 281–266 BC: Mithridates I Ktistes
  - 266–250 BC: Ariobarzanes
  - c. 250–220 BC: Mithridates II
  - c. 220–185 BC: Mithridates III
  - c. 185 – c. 170 BC: Pharnaces I
  - c. 170 – 150 BC: Mithridates IV and Laodice
  - c. 150 – 120 BC: Mithridates V Euergetes
  - 120–63 BC: Mithridates VI Eupator
  - 63–47 BC: Pharnaces II
  - 47–37 BC: Darius
  - 37 BC: Arsaces
  - 37–8 BC: Polemon I
  - 8 BC – 38 AD: Pythodorida
  - 38 AD – 62 AD: Polemon II
- History
  - Founded by Mithridates I: 281 BC
  - Conquered by Pompey of the Roman Republic, remained as a client state (eastern part of the kingdom).: 63 BC
  - Annexed by the Roman Empire under Emperor Nero.: 62 AD
Preceded by	Succeeded by
Antigonid dynasty	Bithynia and Pontus

Pontus (Ancient Greek: Πόντος Pontos, sea) was a Hellenistic kingdom centered in the historical region of Pontus, in northern Anatolia, on the southern coast of the Black Sea (Ancient Greek: Εύξεινος Πόντος, literally meaning "hospitable sea"). It was ruled by the Mithridatic dynasty of Persian origin, which may have been directly related to Darius the Great of the Achaemenid dynasty.

The kingdom was proclaimed by Mithridates I in 281 BC and lasted until its conquest by the Roman Republic in 63 BC. The Kingdom of Pontus reached its greatest extent under Mithridates VI the Great, who conquered Colchis, Cappadocia, Bithynia and the Greek colonies of the Tauric Chersonesos, plus (only temporarily) the Roman province of Asia. After a long struggle with Rome in the Mithridatic Wars, Pontus was defeated. The kingdom had three cultural strands, which often fused together: Greek (mostly on the coast and urban centres), Persian, and Anatolian. Greek became the official language of the kingdom in the 3rd century BC.

== Features of Pontus ==
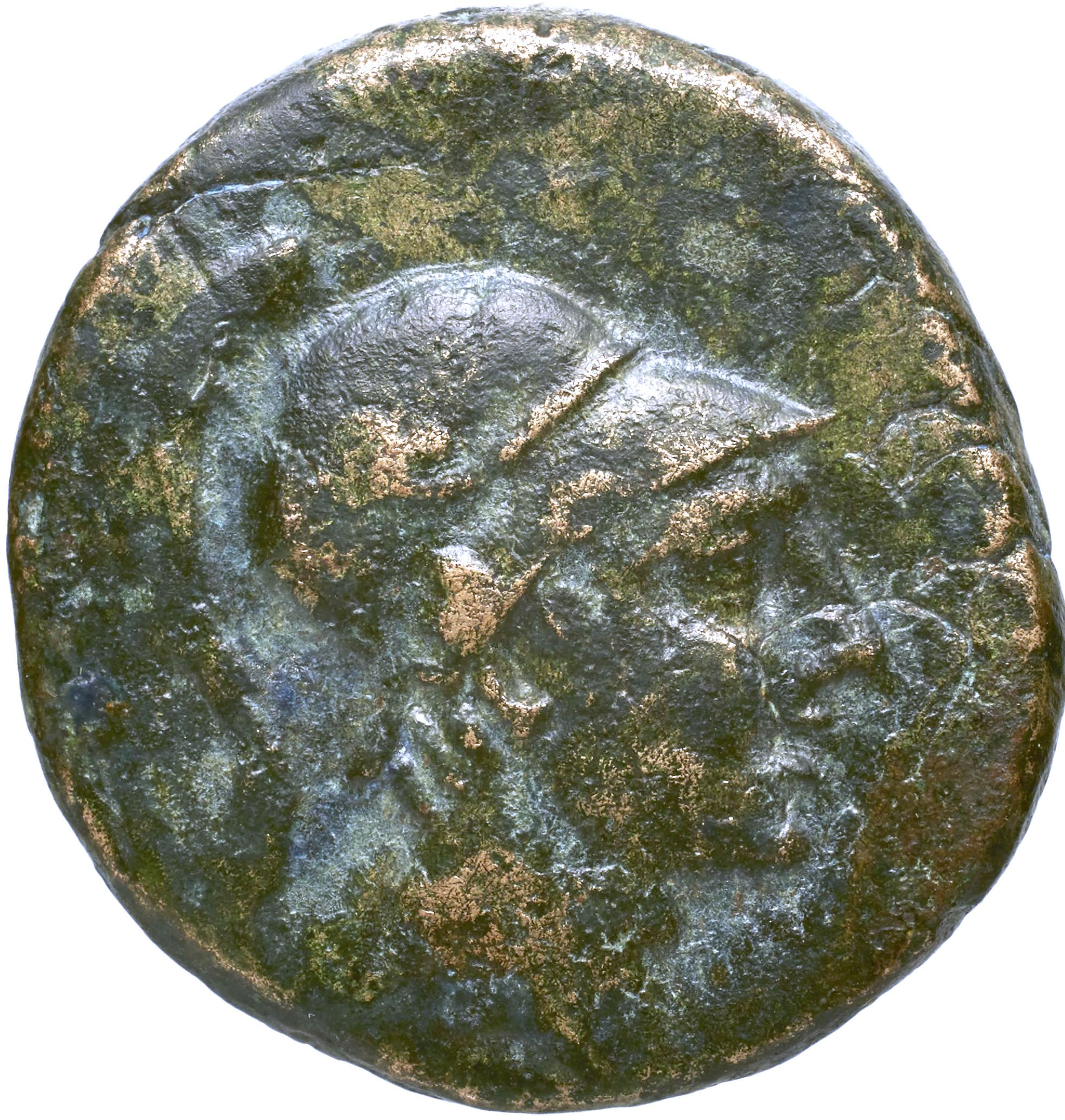
Coin of Pont Amisos

The Kingdom of Pontus was divided into two distinct areas: the coastal region and the Pontic interior. The coastal region bordering the Black Sea was separated from the mountainous inland area by the Pontic Alps, which run parallel to the coast. The river valleys of Pontus also ran parallel to the coast and were quite fertile, supporting cattle herds, millet, and fruit trees, including cherry, apple, and pear. (Cherry and Cerasus are probably cognates.) The coastal region was dominated by Greek cities such as Amastris and Sinope, which became the Pontic capital after its capture. The coast was rich in timber, fishing, and olives. Pontus was also rich in iron and silver, which were mined near the coast south of Pharnacia; steel from the Chalybian mountains became quite famous in Greece. There were also copper, lead, zinc and arsenic. The Pontic interior also had fertile river valleys such as the river Lycus and Iris. The major city of the interior was Amasia, the early Pontic capital, where the Pontic kings had their palace and royal tombs. Besides Amasia and a few other cities, the interior was dominated mainly by small villages. The kingdom of Pontus was divided into districts named Eparchies.

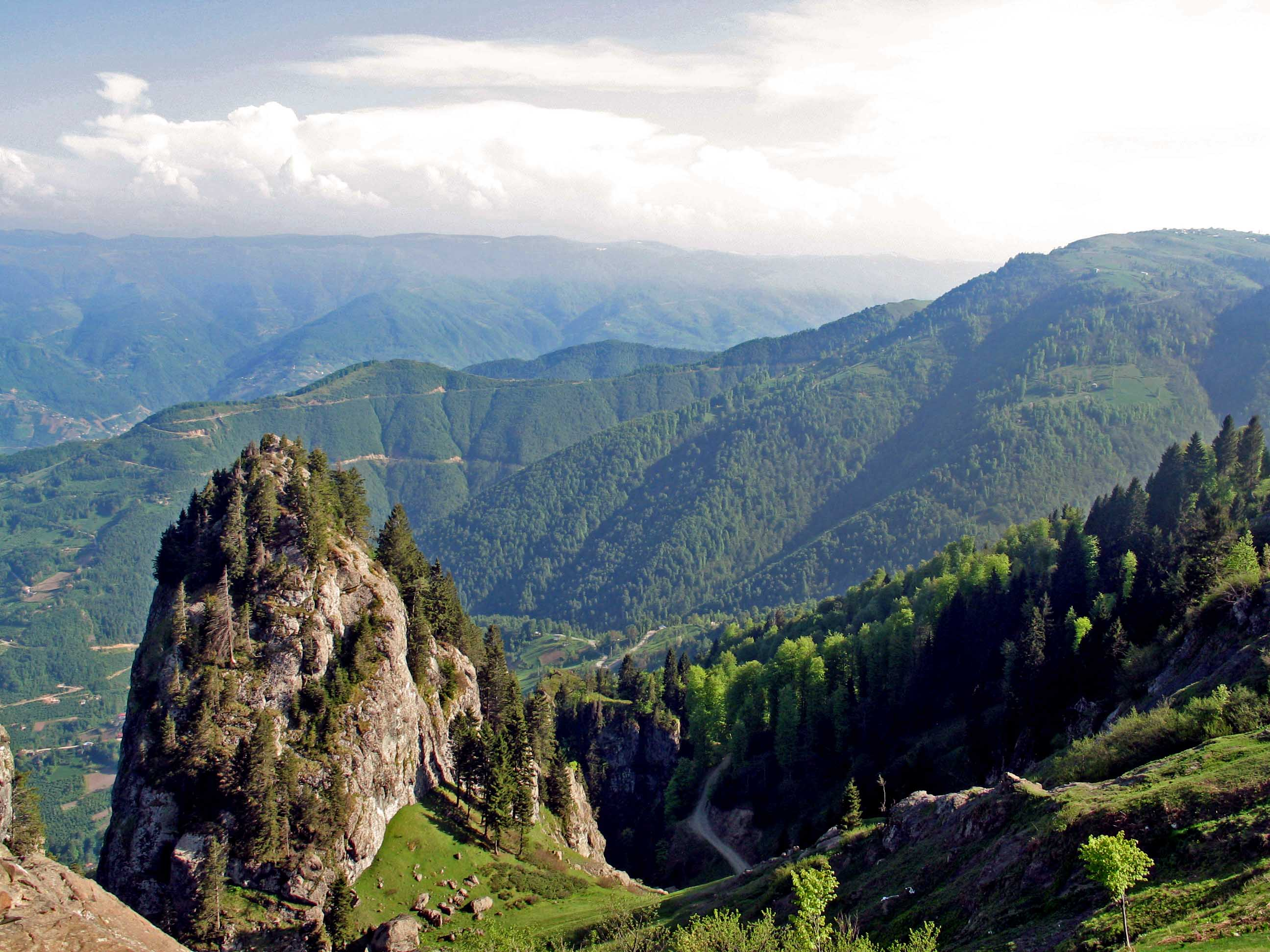
The Pontic Alps which divided the kingdom.

The division between coast and interior was also cultural. The coast was mainly Greek and focused on sea trade. The interior was occupied by the Anatolian Cappadocians and Paphlagonians ruled by an Iranian aristocracy that went back to the Persian empire. The interior also had powerful temples with large estates. The gods of the Kingdom were mostly syncretic, with features of local gods along with Persian and Greek deities. Major gods included the Persian Ahuramazda, who was termed Zeus Stratios; the moon god Men Pharnacou; and Ma (interpreted as Cybele).

Sun gods were particularly popular, with the royal house being identified with the Persian god Ahuramazda of the Achaemenid dynasty; both Apollo and Mithras were worshipped by the Kings. Indeed, the name used by the majority of the Pontic kings was Mithridates, which means "given by Mithras". Pontic culture represented a synthesis between Iranian, Anatolian and Greek elements, with the former two mostly associated with the interior parts, and the latter more so with the coastal region. By the time of Mithridates VI Eupator, Greek was the official language of the Kingdom, though Anatolian languages continued to be spoken in the interior.

== History ==
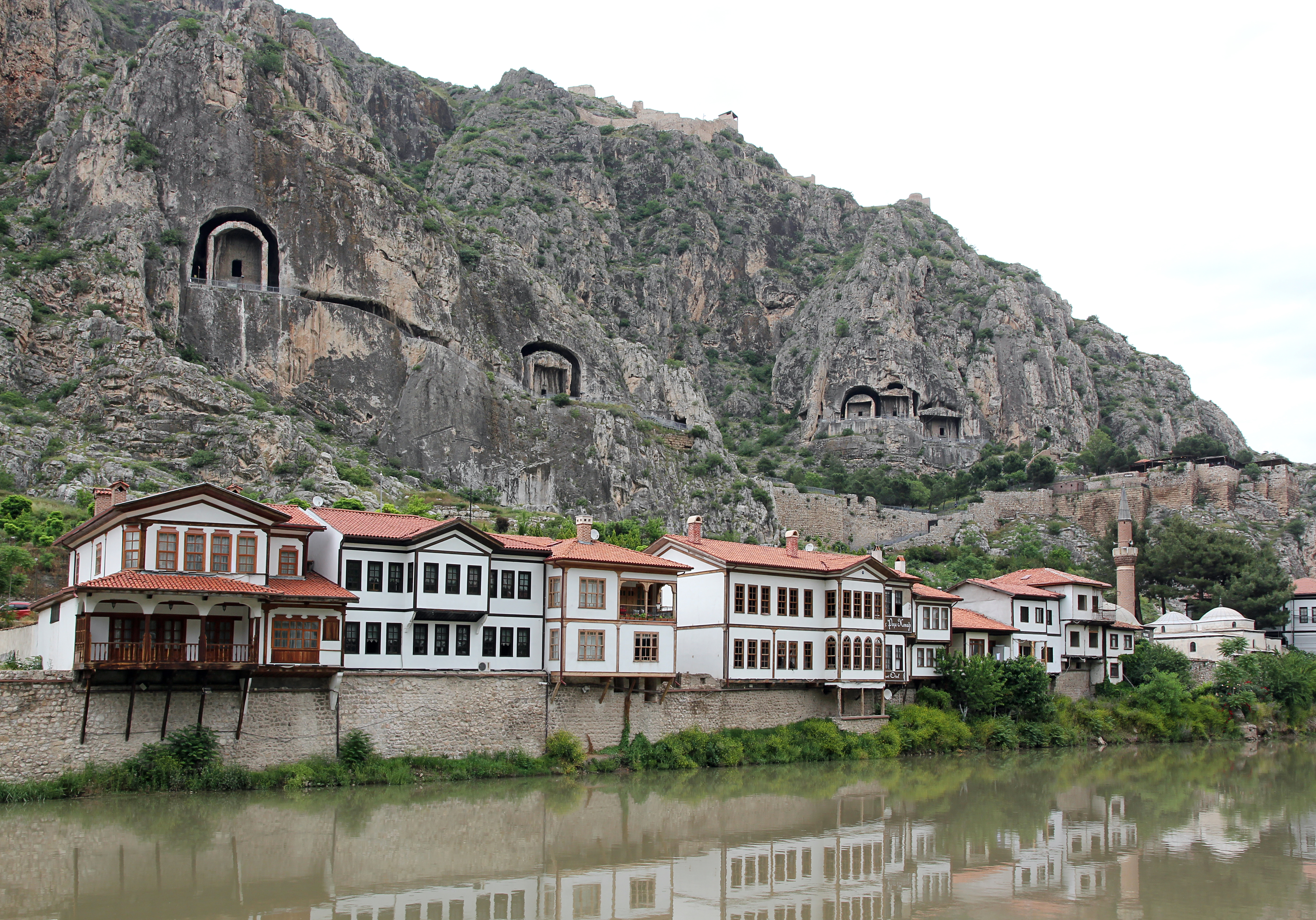
Ancient Pontic tombs on the mountains of Amasya

=== Mithridatic dynasty of Cius ===
The region of Pontus was originally part of the Persian satrapy of Cappadocia (Katpatuka). The Persian dynasty which was to found this kingdom had, during the 4th century BC, ruled the Greek city of Cius (or Kios) in Mysia, with its first known member being Mithridates of Cius. His son Ariobarzanes II became satrap of Phrygia. He became a strong ally of Athens and revolted against Artaxerxes, but was betrayed by his son Mithridates II of Cius. Mithridates II remained as ruler after Alexander's conquests and was a vassal to Antigonus I Monophthalmus, who briefly ruled Asia Minor after the Partition of Triparadisus. Mithridates was killed by Antigonus in 302 BC under suspicion that he was working with his enemy Cassander. Antigonus planned to kill Mithridates' son, also called Mithridates (later named Ktistes, 'founder') but Demetrius I warned him and he escaped to the east with six horsemen. Mithridates first went to the city of Cimiata in Paphlagonia and later to Amasya in Cappadocia. He ruled from 302 to 266 BC, fought against Seleucus I and, in 281 (or 280) BC, declared himself king (basileus) of a state in northern Cappadocia and eastern Paphlagonia. He further expanded his kingdom to the river Sangrius in the west. His son Ariobarzanes captured Amastris in 279, its first important Black sea port. Mithridates also allied with the newly arrived Galatians and defeated a force sent against him by Ptolemy I. Ptolemy had been expanding his territory in Asia Minor since the beginning of the First Syrian war against Antiochus in the mid-270s and was allied with Mithridates' enemy, Heraclea Pontica.

=== Kingdom of Pontus ===
We know little of Ariobarzanes' short reign, except that when he died his son Mithridates II (c. 250—189) became king and was attacked by the Galatians. Mithridates II received aid from Heraclea Pontica, who was also at war with the Galatians at this time. Mithridates went on to support Antiochus Hierax against his brother Seleucus II Callinicus. Seleucus was defeated in Anatolia by Hierax, Mithridates, and the Galatians. Mithridates also attacked Sinope in 220 but failed to take the city. He married Seleucus II's sister and gave his daughter in marriage to Antiochus III, to obtain recognition for his new kingdom and create strong ties with the Seleucid Empire. The sources are silent on Pontus for the years following the death of Mithridates II, when his son Mithridates III ruled (c. 220–198/88).

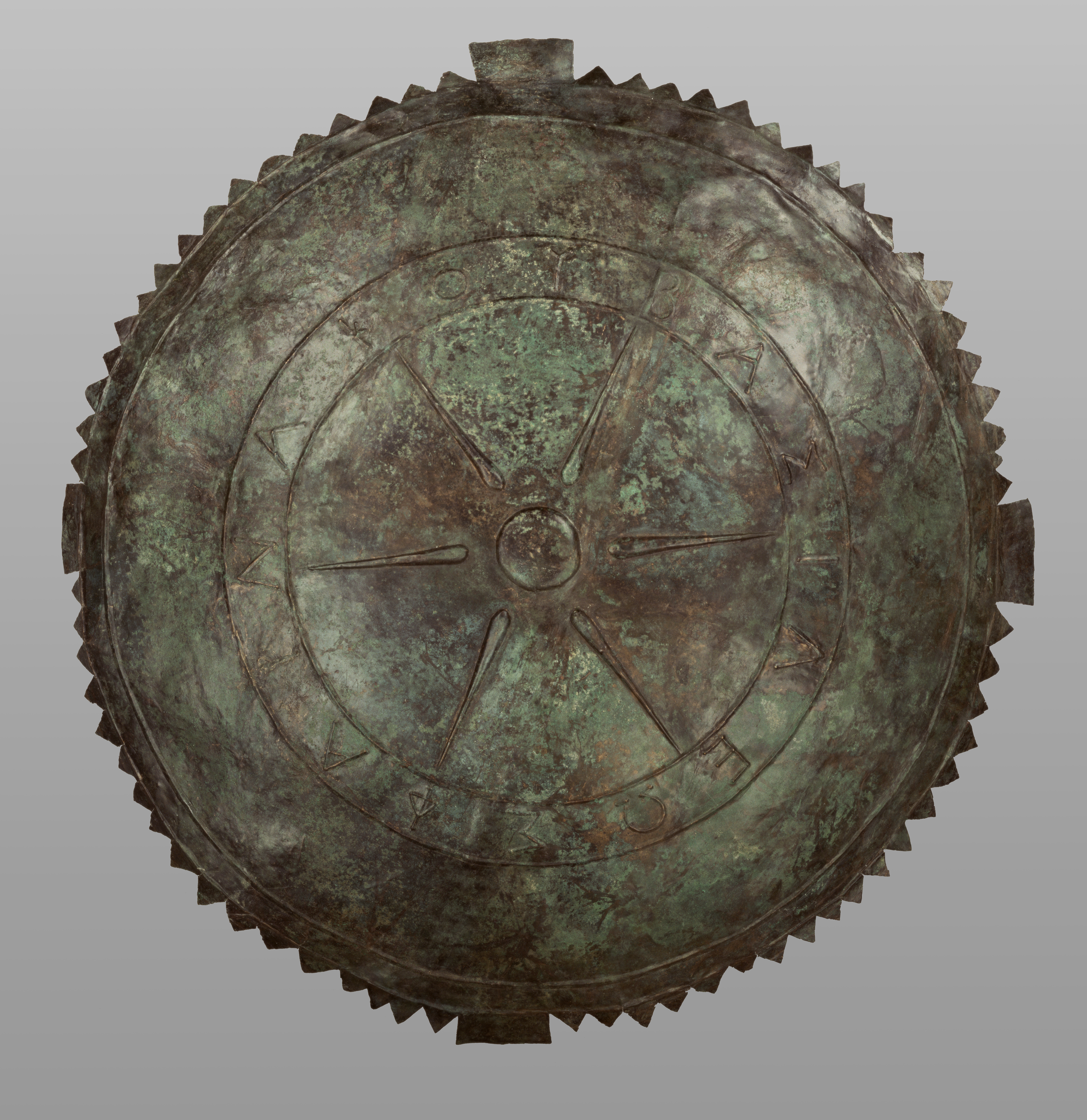
Bronze shield in the name of King Pharnakes: ΦΑΡΝΑΚΟΥ ΒΑΣΙΛΕΩΣ, Getty Villa (80.AC.60)

Pharnaces I of Pontus was much more successful in his expansion of the kingdom at the expense of the Greek coastal cities. He joined in a war with Prusias I of Bithynia against Eumenes of Pergamon in 188 BC, but the two made peace in 183 after Bithynia suffered a series of reversals. He took Sinope in 182 BC and although the Rhodians complained to Rome about this, nothing was done. Pharnaces also took the coastal cities of Cotyora, Pharnacia, and Trapezus in the east, effectively gaining control of most of the northern Anatolian coastline. Despite Roman attempts to keep the peace, Pharnaces fought against Eumenes of Pergamon and Ariarathes of Cappadocia. While initially successful, it seems he was overmatched by 179 when he was forced to sign a treaty. He had to give up all lands he had obtained in Galatia, and Paphlagonia and the city of Tium, but he kept Sinope. Seeking to extend his influence to the north, Pharnaces allied with the cities in the Chersonesus and with other Black Sea cities such as Odessus on the Bulgarian coast. Pharnaces' brother, Mithridates IV Philopator Philadelphus adopted a peaceful, pro-Roman policy. He sent aid to the Roman ally Attalus II Philadelphus of Pergamon against Prusias II of Bithynia in 155.

His successor, Mithridates V of Pontus Euergetes, remained a friend of Rome and in 149 BC sent ships and a small force of auxiliaries to aid Rome in the Third Punic War. He also sent troops for the war against Eumenes III (Aristonicus), who had usurped the Pergamene throne after the death of Attalus III. After Rome received the Kingdom of Pergamon in the will of Attalus III in the absence of an heir, they turned part of it into the province of Asia, while giving the rest to loyal allied kings. For his loyalty Mithridates was awarded the region of Phrygia Major. The kingdom of Cappadocia received Lycaonia. Because of this it seems reasonable to assume that Pontus had some degree of control over Galatia, since Phrygia does not border Pontus directly. It is possible that Mithridates inherited part of Paphlagonia after the death of its King, Pylaemenes. Mithridates V married his daughter Laodice to the king of Cappadocia, Ariarathes VI of Cappadocia, and he also went on to invade Cappadocia, though the details of this war are unknown. Hellenization continued under Mithridates V. He was the first king to widely recruit Greek mercenaries in the Aegean, he was honored at Delos, and he depicted himself as Apollo on his coins. Mithridates was assassinated at Sinope in 121/0, the details of which are unclear.

Because both the sons of Mithridates V, Mithridates VI and Mithridates Chrestus, were still children, Pontus now came under the regency of his wife Laodice. She favored Chrestus, and Mithridates VI escaped the Pontic court. Legend would later say this was the time he traveled through Asia Minor, building his resistance to poisons and learning all of the languages of his subjects. He returned in 113 BC to depose his mother; she was thrown into prison, and he eventually had his brother killed.

=== Mithridates VI Eupator ===
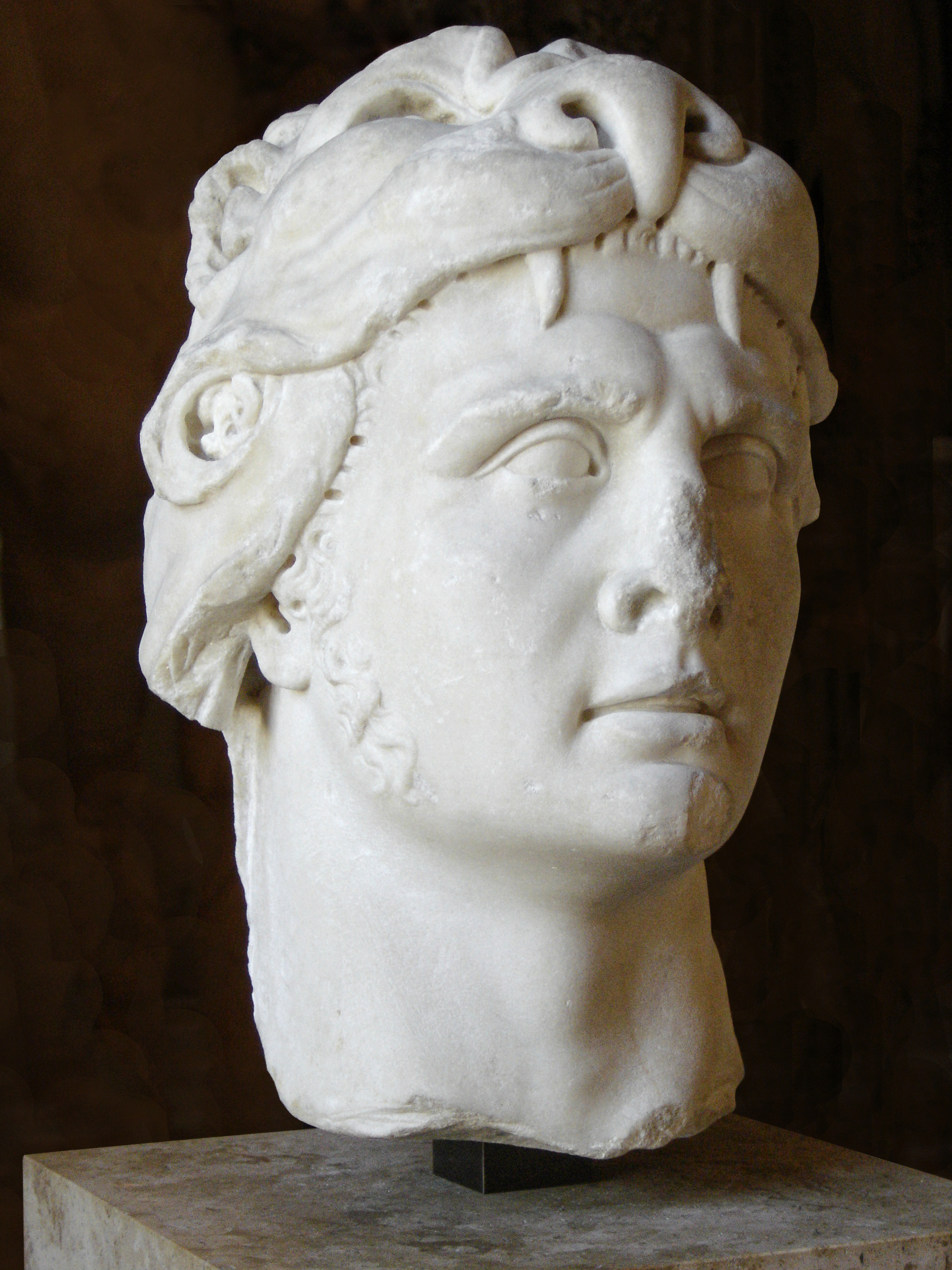
Bust of Mithridates VI from the Louvre

Mithridates VI Eupator, 'the Good Father', followed a decisive anti-Roman agenda, extolling Greek and Iranian culture against ever-expanding Roman influence. Rome had recently created the province of Asia in Anatolia, and it had also rescinded the region of Phrygia Major from Pontus during the reign of Laodice. Mithridates began his expansion by inheriting Lesser Armenia from King Antipater (precise date unknown, c.115–106) and by conquering the Kingdom of Colchis. Colchis was an important region in Black Sea trade – rich with gold, wax, hemp, and honey. The cities of the Tauric Chersonesus now appealed for his aid against the Scythians in the north. Mithridates sent 6,000 men under General Diophantus. After various campaigns in the north of the Crimea he controlled all of the Chersonesus. Mithridates also developed trade links with cities on the western Black Sea coast.

At the time, Rome was fighting the Jugurthine and Cimbric wars. Mithridates and Nicomedes of Bithynia both invaded Paphlagonia and divided it amongst themselves. A Roman embassy was sent, but it accomplished nothing. Mithridates also took a part of Galatia that had previously been part of his father's kingdom and intervened in Cappadocia, where his sister Laodice was queen. In 116 the king of Cappadocia, Ariarathes VI, was murdered by the Cappadocian noble Gordius at the behest of Mithridates, and Laodice ruled as regent over the sons of Ariarathes until 102 BC. After Nicomedes III of Bithynia married Laodice, he tried to intervene in the region by sending troops; Mithridates swiftly invaded, placing his nephew Ariarathes VII of Cappadocia on the throne of Cappadocia. War soon broke out between the two, and Mithridates invaded with a large Pontic army, but Ariarathes VII was murdered in 101 BC before any battle was fought. Mithridates then installed his eight-year-old son, Ariarathes IX of Cappadocia as king, with Gordius as regent. In 97 Cappadocia rebelled, but the uprising was swiftly put down by Mithridates. Afterwards, Mithridates and Nicomedes III both sent embassies to Rome. The Roman Senate decreed that Mithridates had to withdraw from Cappadocia and Nicomedes from Paphlagonia. Mithridates obliged, and the Romans installed Ariobarzanes in Cappadocia. In 91/90 BC, while Rome was busy in the Social War in Italy, Mithridates encouraged his new ally and son-in-law, King Tigranes the Great of Armenia, to invade Cappadocia, which he did, and Ariobarzanes fled to Rome. Mithridates then deposed Nicomedes IV from Bithynia, placing Socrates Chrestus on the throne.

==== The First Mithridatic War ====
A Roman army under Manius Aquillius arrived in Asia Minor in 90 BC, prompting Mithridates and Tigranes to withdraw. Cappadocia and Bithynia were restored to their respective monarchs, but then faced large debts to Rome due to their bribes for the Roman senators, and Nicomedes IV was eventually convinced by Aquillius to attack Pontus in order to repay the debts. He plundered as far as Amastris, and returned with much loot. Mithridates invaded Cappadocia once again, and Rome declared war.

In the summer of 89 BC, Mithridates invaded Bithynia and defeated Nicomedes and Aquillius in battle. He moved swiftly into Roman Asia and resistance crumbled; by 88 he had obtained the surrender of most of the newly created province. He was welcomed in many cities, where the residents chafed under Roman tax farming. In 88 Mithridates also ordered the massacre of at least 80,000 Romans and Italians in what became known as the 'Asiatic Vespers'. Many Greek cities in Asia Minor happily carried out the orders; this ensured that they could no longer return to an alliance with Rome. In the autumn of 88 Mithridates also placed Rhodes under siege, but he failed to take it.

In Athens, anti-Roman elements were emboldened by the news and soon formed an alliance with Mithridates. A joint Pontic–Athenian naval expedition took Delos in 88 BC, and granted the city to Athens. Many Greek city-states now joined Mithridates, including Sparta, the Achaean League, and most of the Boeotian League except Thespiae. Finally, in 87 BC, Lucius Cornelius Sulla set out from Italy with five legions. He marched through Boeotia, which quickly surrendered, and began laying siege to Athens and the Piraeus (the Athenian port city, no longer connected by the Long Walls). Athens fell in March 86 BC, and the city was sacked. After stiff resistance, Archelaus, the Pontic general in Piraeus, left by sea, and Sulla utterly destroyed the port city. Meanwhile, Mithridates had sent his son Arcathias with a large army via Thrace into Greece.

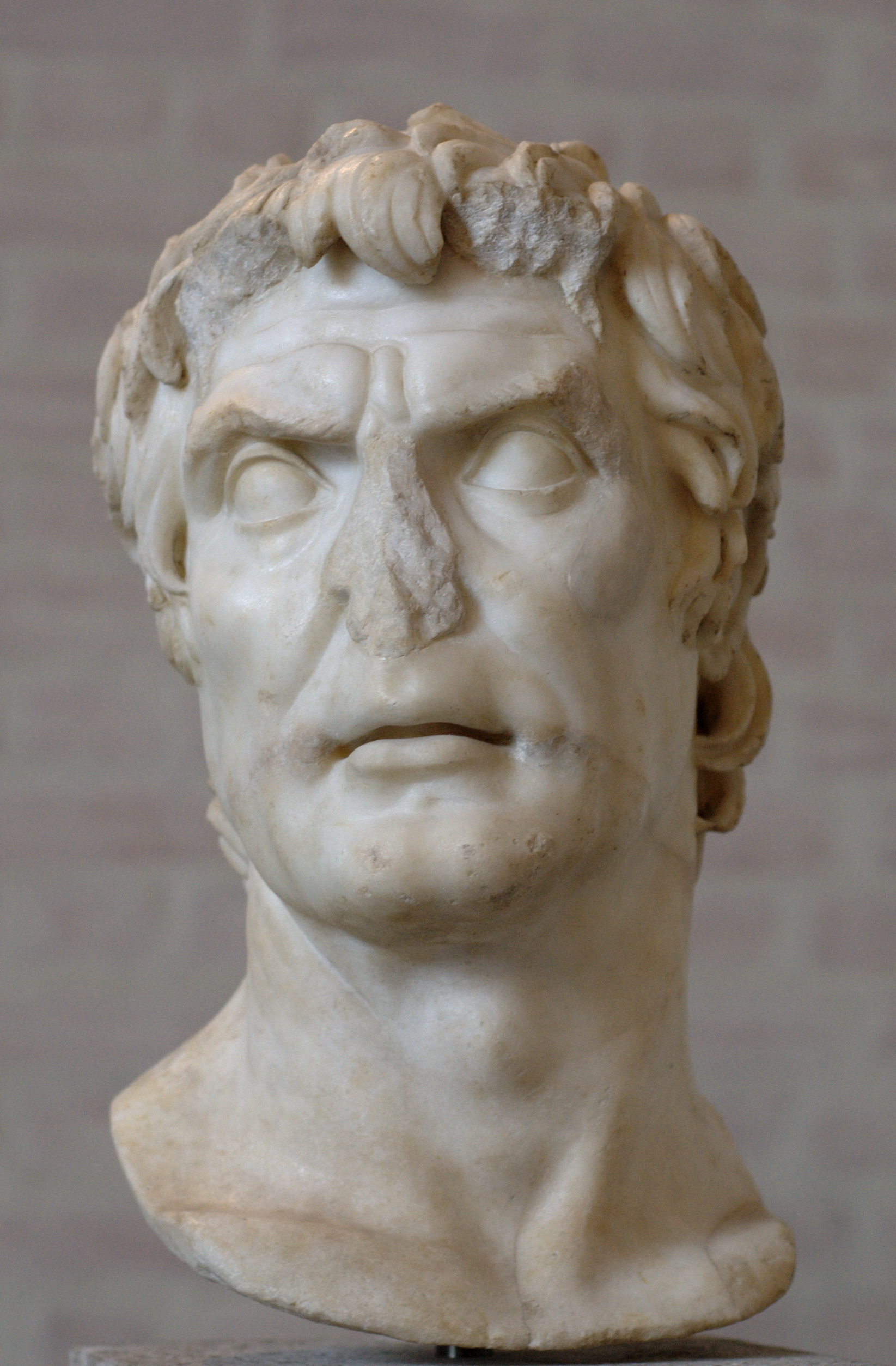
Lucius Cornelius Sulla

Sulla now headed north, seeking the fertile plains of Boeotia to supply his army. At the Battle of Chaeronea, Sulla inflicted severe casualties on Archelaus, who nevertheless retreated and continued to raid Greece with the Pontic fleet. Archelaus regrouped and attacked a second time at the Battle of Orchomenus in 85 BC but was once again defeated and suffered heavy losses. As a result of the losses and the unrest they stirred in Asia Minor, as well as the presence of the Roman army now campaigning in Bithynia, Mithridates was forced to accept a peace deal. Mithridates and Sulla met in 85 BC at Dardanus. Sulla decreed that Mithridates had to surrender Roman Asia and return Bithynia and Cappadocia to their former kings. He also had to pay 2,000 talents and provide ships. Mithridates would retain the rest of his holdings and become an ally of Rome.

==== Second and Third Mithridatic wars ====
The treaty agreed with Sulla was not to last. From 83 to 82 BC Mithridates fought against and defeated Licinius Murena, who had been left by Sulla to organize the province of Asia. The so-called Second Mithridatic war ended without any territorial gains by either side. The Romans now began securing the coastal region of Lycia and Pamphylia from pirates and established control over Pisidia and Lycaonia. When in 74 the consul Lucullus took over Cilicia, Mithridates faced Roman commanders on two fronts. The Cilician pirates had not been completely defeated, and Mithridates signed an alliance with them. He was also allied with the government of Quintus Sertorius in Spain and with his help reorganized some of his troops in the Roman legionary pattern with short stabbing swords.

The Third Mithridatic War broke out when Nicomedes IV of Bithynia died without heirs in 75 and left his kingdom to Rome. In 74 BC Rome mobilized its armies in Asia Minor, probably provoked by some move made by Mithridates, but sources are not clear on this. In 73 Mithridates invaded Bithynia, and his fleet defeated the Romans off Chalcedon and laid siege to Cyzicus. Lucullus marched from Phrygia with his five legions and forced Mithridates to retreat to Pontus. In 72 BC Lucullus invaded Pontus through Galatia and marched north following the river Halys to the north coast, he besieged Amisus, which withstood until 70 BC. In 71 he marched through the Iris and Lycus river valleys and established his base in Cabeira. Mithridates sent his cavalry to cut the Roman supply line to Cappadocia in the south, but they suffered heavy casualties. Mithridates, still unwilling to fight a decisive engagement, now began a retreat to Lesser Armenia, where he expected aid from his ally Tigranes the Great. Because of his now weakened cavalry, the retreat turned into an all-out rout, and most of the Pontic army was destroyed or captured. These events led Machares, the son of Mithridates and ruler of the Crimean Bosporus, to seek an alliance with Rome. Mithridates fled to Armenia.

In the summer of 69 Lucullus invaded Armenian territory, marching with 12,000 men through Cappadocia into Sophene. His target was Tigranocerta, the new capital of Tigranes's empire. Tigranes retreated to gather his forces. Lucullus laid siege to the city, and Tigranes returned with his army, including large numbers of heavily armored cavalrymen, termed Cataphracts, vastly outnumbering Lucullus' force. Despite this, Lucullus led his men in a charge against the Armenian horses and won a great victory at the Battle of Tigranocerta. Tigranes fled north while Lucullus destroyed his new capital city and dismantled his holdings in the south by granting independence to Sophene and returning Syria to the Seleucid king Antiochus XIII Asiaticus. In 68 BC Lucullus invaded northern Armenia, ravaging the country and capturing Nisibis, but Tigranes avoided battle. Meanwhile, Mithridates invaded Pontus, and in 67 he defeated a large Roman force near Zela. Lucullus, now in command of tired and discontented troops, withdrew to Pontus, then to Galatia. He was replaced by two new consuls arriving from Italy with fresh legions, Marcius Rex and Acilius Glabrio. Mithridates now recovered Pontus while Tigranes invaded Cappadocia.

In response to increasing pirate activity in the eastern Mediterranean, the senate granted Pompey extensive proconsular Imperium throughout the Mediterranean in 67 BC. Pompey eliminated the pirates, and in 66 he was assigned command in Asia Minor to deal with Pontus. Pompey organized his forces, close to 45,000 legionaries, including Lucullus' troops, and signed an alliance with the Parthians, who attacked and kept Tigranes busy in the east. Mithridates massed his army, some 30,000 men and 2,000–3,000 cavalry, in the heights of Dasteira in lesser Armenia. Pompey fought to encircle him with earthworks for six weeks, but Mithridates eventually retreated north. Pompey pursued and managed to catch his forces by surprise in the night, and the Pontic army suffered heavy casualties. After the battle, Pompey founded the city of Nicopolis. Mithridates fled to Colchis, and later to his son Machares in the Crimea in 65 BC. Pompey now headed east into Armenia, where Tigranes submitted to him, placing his royal diadem at his feet. Pompey took most of Tigranes' empire in the east but allowed him to remain as king of Armenia. Meanwhile, Mithridates was organizing a defense of the Crimea when his son Pharnaces led the army in revolt; Mithridates was forced to commit suicide or was assassinated.

=== Roman province and client kingdoms ===
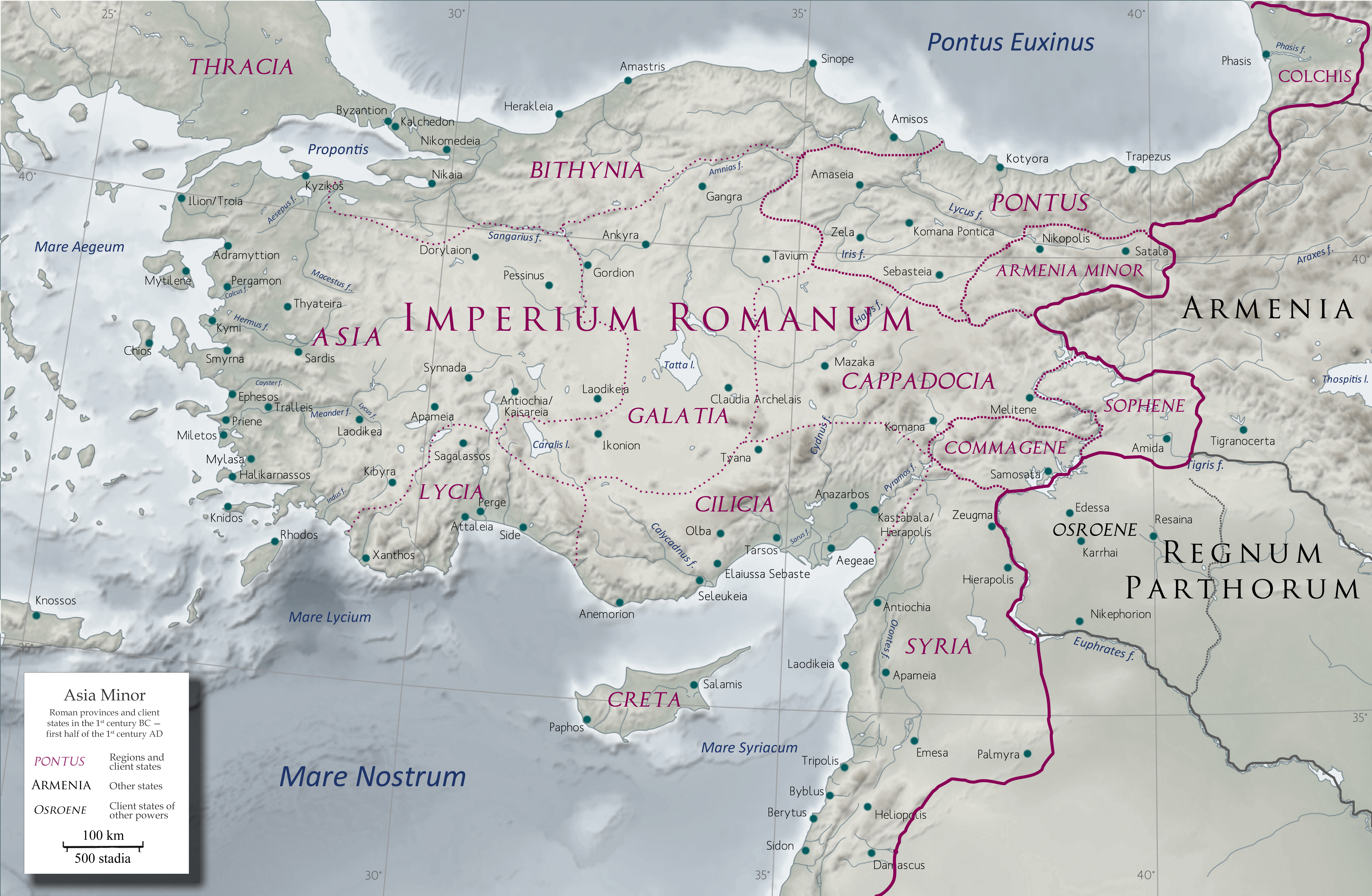
Anatolia in the early 1st century AD with Pontus as a Roman client state

The Roman client kingdom of Pontus, c. AD 50.

Most of the western half of Pontus and the Greek cities of the coast, including Sinope, were annexed by Rome directly as part of the Roman province of Bithynia et Pontus. The interior and eastern coast remained an independent client kingdom. The Bosporan Kingdom also remained independent under Pharnaces II of Pontus as an ally and friend of Rome. Colchis was also made into a client kingdom. Pharnaces II later made an attempt at reconquering Pontus. During the civil war of Caesar and Pompey, he invaded Asia Minor (48 BC), taking Colchis, lesser Armenia, Pontus, and Cappadocia and defeating a Roman army at Nicopolis. Caesar responded swiftly and defeated him at Zela, where he uttered the famous phrase 'Veni, vidi, vici'. Pontic kings continued to rule the client Kingdom of Pontus, Colchis, and Cilicia until Polemon II was forced to abdicate the Pontic throne by Nero in AD 62.

== Coinage ==
Although the Pontic kings claimed descent from the Persian royal house, they generally acted as Hellenistic kings and portrayed themselves as such in their coins, mimicking Alexander's royal stater.

== Military ==
The army of the Pontic Kingdom had a varied ethnic composition, as it recruited its soldiers from all over the kingdom. The standing army included Armenians, Bastarnae, Bithynians, Cappadocians, Galatians, Heniochoi, Iazyges, Koralloi, Leucosyrians, Phrygians, Sarmatians, Scythians, Tauri, and Thracians, as well as soldiers from other areas around the Black Sea. The Greeks who served in the military were not part of the standing army, but rather fought as citizens of their respective cities. Like many Hellenistic armies, the army of Pontus adopted the Macedonian phalanx; it fielded a corps of Chalkaspides ('bronze-shields'), for example against Sulla at the Battle of Chaeronea, while at the same battle 15,000 phalangites were recruited from freed slaves. Pontus also fielded various cavalry units, including cataphracts. In addition to normal cavalry Pontus also fielded scythed chariots. Under Mithridates VI Pontus also fielded a corps of 120,000 troops armed "in the Roman fashion" and "drilled in the Roman phalanx formation". These units imitated Roman legions, although it is disputed to what degree they achieved this.

The navy was organized in a similar fashion as the army. While the kingdom itself provided the main contingent of ships, a small portion represented the Greek cities. The crewmen either came from the various tribes of the kingdom, or were of Greek origin.

== See also ==
- Bosporan Kingdom
- Ethnarchy of Comana
- Pontic Greek
- Ionic Greek
- Empire of Trebizond

== Sources ==
=== Modern sources ===
- Crook, John; Lintott, Andrew; Rawson, Elizabeth, eds. (1992). The Cambridge ancient history. Vol. 9 (2nd ed.). Cambridge University Press. ISBN 0-521-85073-8. OCLC 121060.
- Hazel, John (2002). Who's who in the Roman World. Routledge. ISBN 978-0-415-29162-0.
- Heckel, Waldemar (2020). In the Path of Conquest Resistance to Alexander the Great. Oxford University Press.
- McGing, Brian C. (1986). The Foreign Policy of Mithridates VI Eupator, King of Pontus. Brill. ISBN 978-90-04-07591-7.
- McGing, Brian (2004). "Pontus". Encyclopædia Iranica.

=== Ancient sources ===
- Polybius, the histories.
- Appian, the foreign wars.
- Memnon of Heraclea, history of Heraclea.
- Strabo, Geographica.
- Plutarch, Parallel lives. 'Demetrius'.
