= Antiochus (play) =

Play by John Mottley

- Written by: John Mottley
- Original language: English
- Genre: Tragedy

Premiere
- Date premiered: 13 April 1721
- Place premiered: Lincoln's Inn Fields Theatre

Antiochus is a 1721 tragedy by the British writer John Mottley. The play is set in Ancient Greece, revolving round the relationship between Stratonice of Syria and Seleucus I Nicator and his son Antiochus I Soter, the leaders of the Seleucid Empire.

The original Lincoln's Inn Fields cast included James Quin as Selecus, Lacy Ryan as Antiochus, John Egleton as Arsaces, Richard Diggs as Cleartes, Anthony Boheme as Nicanor, Elizabeth Spiller as Semandra and Anna Maria Seymour as Stratonice.

== Bibliography ==
- Baines, Paul & Ferarro, Julian & Rogers, Pat. The Wiley-Blackwell Encyclopedia of Eighteenth-Century Writers and Writing, 1660-1789. Wiley-Blackwell, 2011.
- Burling, William J. A Checklist of New Plays and Entertainments on the London Stage, 1700-1737. Fairleigh Dickinson Univ Press, 1992.
