= Demetrius II Aetolicus =

King of Macedon, 239 – 229 BC

Demetrius II Δημήτριος
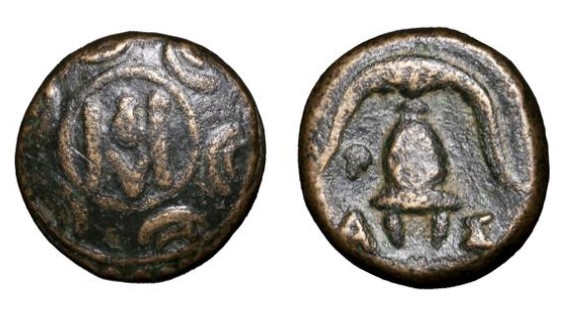
- Bronze drachma likely struck during the reign of Demetrius. (Note: Demetrius may have minted bronze drachmas in his own name, but these issues could be that of Demetrius' grandfather, Demetrius I. Demetrius II never struck silver coins in his own name, instead continuing to produce his father's tetradrachms.) Obv.: Macedonian shield rev.: Macedonian helmet with ΒΑΣ[ΙΛΕΩΣ] imprinted along bottom.

King of Macedonia
- Reign: 239–229 BC
- Predecessor: Antigonus II Gonatas
- Successor: Antigonus III Doson
- Born: c. 275/4 BC
- Died: 229 BC (aged c. 45)
- Spouse: Stratonice; Nicaea; Phthia; Chryseis
- Issue: Apama III; Philip V
- Dynasty: Antigonid dynasty
- Father: Antigonus II Gonatas
- Mother: Phila

Demetrius II (Greek: Δημήτριος, romanized: Demetrios; c. 275 - 229 BC), also known as Demetrius Aetolicus, was king of the Ancient Greek kingdom of Macedonia from 239 until his death in 229 BC.

== Biography ==
Demetrius was born in either 275 or 274 BC and was the only child of King Antigonus II Gonatas by Phila, the daughter of Seleucus I. He had an elder half-brother named Halcyoneus, but he died in an unknown battle sometime before the death of Antigonus in 239 BC. He had already distinguished himself during his father's lifetime by defeating Alexander II of Epirus at Derdia and so saving Macedonia (c. 260 BC). There is a possibilitythat his father had already elevated him to position of power equal to his own before his death. If this had occurred it would be in 256 or 257 BC.

On his accession, Demetrius faced a coalition of enemies which included the two great leagues. Usually rivals, the Aetolian and Achaean Leagues now became allies against the Macedonian power. He succeeded in dealing this coalition severe blows, wresting Boeotia from their alliance. The revolution in Epirus, which substituted a republican league for the monarchy, gravely weakened his position.

During his reign, his kingdom extended into Euboea, Magnesia, Thessaly and its environs, excluding Dolopia and possibly Peparethos and Achaea Phthiotis.

In 236 BC, he invaded Boeotia, making the Boeotians submit immediately.

In 234 BC, due to a federal republic replacing the monarchy in Epirus, which led to the events of 231 BC, Demetrius hired Agron for military aid against the advancing Aetolians. His kingdom was not threatened by the Illyrian Ardiaei, ruled by Agron, despite them having gathered the greatest force in their history (c. 231 BC), but Epirus needed some sort of force to deter them.

At some point in 230–229 BC in an unknown location in north-west Macedonia, the Dardani defeated Demetrius who died shortly the next spring at the age of c. 45. His nine year old successor, the future Philip V, was deemed too young to rule by the Macedonian nobility and so Demetrius' half-cousin, Antigonus III Doson, was made regent. The exact location of Demetrius' tomb remains unknown, but was likely in Beroea or Aegae.

== Marriage and family ==
Demetrius married four times, though the chronology of these marriages is a matter of dispute.

- Stratonice of Macedon, his aunt/cousin, the daughter of the Seleucid king Antiochus I and his aunt Stratonice, by whom he had a daughter called Apama III who married Prusias I of Bithynia. Stratonice left him after he married his second wife.
- Nicaea, the widow of his cousin Alexander of Corinth, c. 245/244 BC.
- Phthia (239 BC), daughter of Alexander II of Epirus, and possibly the mother of Philip V of Macedon (Chryseis has also been suggested as his mother).
- Chryseis, probably a former war prisoner turned concubine, whom he married around 237 BC. After Demetrius' death, she married his successor, Antigonus.

Information regarding the life of Demetrius is drawn mainly from inscriptions, as only Plutarch writes of him, in Life of Aratus, and Polybius makes scarce mention of him.

== See also ==
- Ancient Macedonians
- List of ancient Macedonians

Demetrius II Antigonid dynasty Born: c. 275/4 BC Died: 229 BC
Royal titles
Preceded by Antigonus II Gonatas	King of Macedon; 239–229 BC	Succeeded by Antigonus III Doson
