= Chryseis of Macedonia =

Queen consort of Macedonia (230s–220s BC)

Chryseis of Macedonia (fl. 230s–220s BC) was a queen consort of Macedonia. She is named by ancient sources as the wife or concubine of Demetrius II and the mother of Philip V. She then married Demetrius’ successor, Antigonus Doson, Philip’s guardian.

According to Eusebius, Chryseis was a captive Demetrius took from Thessalia. Some historians follow Eusebius in saying that she married Demetrius and was Philip’s mother. When Demetrius died when Philip was eight years old, Antigonus Doson prevented a dynastic crisis by becoming Philip’s guardian and marrying Chryseis. They had sons together, but Antigonus treated Philip as his heir.

Demetrius had wives called Stratonike and Phthia, of whom only Phthia is known to have been given the title of queen, basilissa. Philip was born in about 238, at which time Demetrius is known to have been married to Phthia, which has led some historians to argue that Chryseis was a nickname for Phthia or that Phthia was Philip’s mother instead.

According to Polybius, Chryseis made a generous donation of grain and lead for the relief of the 226/7 earthquake in Rhodes.
