= Antiochus (father of Seleucus I Nicator) =

4th-century BC Macedonian general

Antiochus (Greek: Ἀντίοχος; fl. 4th century BC) was a Macedonian man who lived during the time of Philip II of Macedon (ruled 359-336 BC). He originally came from Orestis, Upper Macedonia (modern-day Kastoria, Greece).

== Biography ==
Antiochus served as an officer under Philip II, and gained distinction as a military general. Antiochus was from an upper noble family. His father was probably called Seleucus, his brother was called Ptolemy and he probably had a nephew called Seleucus. Antiochus married a Macedonian woman called Laodice and in about 358 BC Laodice gave birth to their son Seleucus I Nicator, who became a general of Alexander the Great and later founded and became the first king of the Seleucid Empire; she also gave birth to their daughter, Didymeia. It was pretended, in consequence of a dream which Laodice had, that the god Apollo was the real father of Seleucus.

When Seleucus became king, he founded and named 16 cities in honor of his father, including the Syrian city of Antioch (now situated in modern Turkey) and the Seleucid Military Outpost, Antioch, Pisidia. Through Seleucus, Antiochus had thirteen Seleucid kings bearing his name, as well as various monarchs from the Kingdom of Commagene. Antiochus had numerous descendants through his son from the 3rd century BC until the 5th century AD and possibly beyond.

== Sources ==
- John D. Grainger, Seleukos Nikator: Constructing a Hellenistic Kingdom page 2 ISBN 0-415-04701-3
- Roger Campbell-Scott, "Nimrud Dagh - A Sacred Mountain in Anatolia" pgs 194–197 in Reader’s Digest, Vanish Civilisations, Reader's Digest Services P/L, Hong Kong, 1988
- "Places in Bible Times", Reader’s Digest: Jesus and His Times, The Reader's Digest Association, Inc. Printed by Fourth Printing USA, July 1990
- D. Engels, "Prodigies and Religious Propaganda: Seleucus and Augustus", in: C. Deroux (ed.), Studies in Latin Literature and Roman History, vol. 15, Brussels 2010, 153–177.
