= Didymeia (sister of Seleucus I Nicator) =

Sister of Seleucus I Nicator

Didymea or Didymeia (flourished 4th and 3rd centuries BC, Greek: η Δηιδάμεια) was a Macedonian Greek noblewoman.

== Life ==
She originally came from the Macedonian highlands and her family were petty landholders in Europus. Didymeia was the daughter of Antiochus and Laodice of Macedonia. Her father served as a military general under King Philip II of Macedon and gained distinction as one of Philip’s officers. Her brother Seleucus I Nicator was one of the Diadochi of Alexander the Great and her paternal uncle was a Greek soldier called Ptolemy.

She had married an unnamed Greek nobleman and had two sons: Diodotus and Nicomedes. Diodotus, as a nephew of Seleucus I, would become Seleucid satrap of Bactria and his son, Diodotus I Soter would rebel in 255 BC, forming the rival Diodotid Kingdom (see Seleucid Dynastic Wars).

Didymeia’s name and the name of her sons were typical Greek names of their time. She may have been the Didymeia that is associated with the mythology of Seleucus I. Her mother’s alleged sexual relations with Apollo to the allegation that the oracle of the Branchidae that greeted her brother as ‘King’ in 312 BC (see Didyma).

== Sources ==
- Grainger 1990, p. 3
- Heckel, W. (2006). Who's Who in the Age of Alexander the Great: Prosopography of Alexander's Empire. Wiley. ISBN 9781405112109.
- Grainger, J.D. (1990). Seleukos Nikator: Constructing a Hellenistic Kingdom. Routledge. ISBN 9780415047012.
