= Alexander of Corinth =

3rd century BC tyrant of Corinth

Alexander (Ancient Greek: Ἀλέξανδρος) (died 247 BC) was a Macedonian governor and tyrant of Corinth. He was the son of Craterus who had faithfully governed Corinth and Chalcis for his half-brother Antigonus II Gonatas. His grandmother was Phila, the celebrated daughter of Antipater and first wife of Demetrius Poliorcetes. According to a note in Livy (XXXV, 26), his mother's name may have been Nicaea and this was also the name of his wife.

== Career ==
At his father's death around 263, Alexander inherited his position, which went then far beyond that of a mere Macedonian garrison commander and resembled more a dynastic regency in Greece. For some years, Alexander remained loyal to Antigonus, but by 253 he accepted subsidies from the Egyptian king Ptolemy II Philadelphus and resolved to challenge the Macedonian supremacy seeking independence as a tyrant.

The loss of Corinth and Euboea was an almost irreparable blow to the Macedonian hegemony over Greece. Antigonus tried to recover, building an alliance with Athens, Argos and Sicyon, but Alexander managed to pull Sicyon over to his side and subsequently allied himself with the Achaean League. Challenged by a contemporary offensive of his Ptolemaic rival in the Cyclades, Antigonus was unable to protect his allies. In 249, Alexander carried victories over Athens and Argos and the following year he possibly forced his enemies to accept a truce.

== Death and legacy ==
At the height of his power, Alexander died in 247 BC under circumstances which led his contemporaries to believe that he had been poisoned by Antigonus Gonatas.

Alexander's widow Nicaea assumed control of his possessions, but after the death of her protector Ptolemy Philadelphus in 246 her position was weakened. When Antigonus carried a naval victory over his enemies and an Aetolian raid into Boeotia threatened Chalcis, Attica and Corinth, she accepted to marry Antigonus' son and heir Demetrius II Aetolicus. During the marriage celebrations in the winter of 245/44, Antigonus took in the garrison of the Acrocorinth and regained control of his former possessions.
