= Alcyoneus (disambiguation) =

Alcyoneus, Halcyoneus or Alkyoneus (from Ancient Greek: Ἀλκυονεύς, romanized: Alkyoneús) may refer to:

- Alcyoneus (mythology), several figures in Greek mythology
- Alcyoneus, a character in Rick Riordan's The Heroes of Olympus novels; see list
- Hylaeus alcyoneus, a bee species endemic to Australia
- Halcyoneus or Alcyoneus, the son of Antigonus II Gonatas
- Alcyoneus (galaxy), an unusually large radio galaxy
