= Laodice of Macedonia =

Mother of Seleucus, founder of the Seleucid Empire

Laodice of Macedonia (Greek: Λαοδίκη) was a Macedonian noblewoman.

== Biography ==
Wife of Antiochus (fl. 4th century BC), a general of distinction in the service of Philip II of Macedon, she was the mother of Seleucus, the founder of the Seleucid Empire and Seleucus' sister Didymeia. She claimed, in consequence of a dream which she had, that Apollo was the real father of her child. No less than five cities were founded by Seleucus in different parts of his dominions, which bore in her honour the name of Laodicea.
