= Balakros =

4th-century BC Macedonian general

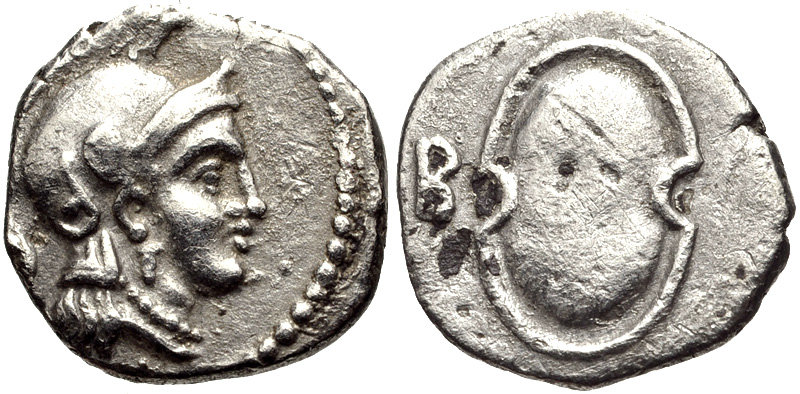
- Coin of Balakros, Satrap of Cilicia, with letter "B" next to the shield, standing for B[AΛAKPOI]. Tarsos. 333-323 BC.
- Spouse: Phila of Macedonia
- Military career
- Allegiance: Macedonian Empire
- Service years: fl. 333 – 323 BC
- Rank: Somatophylakes (bodyguard) Of Alexander the Great; Satrap of Cilicia
- Conflicts: Asia Minor campaigns

Location of Cilicia.

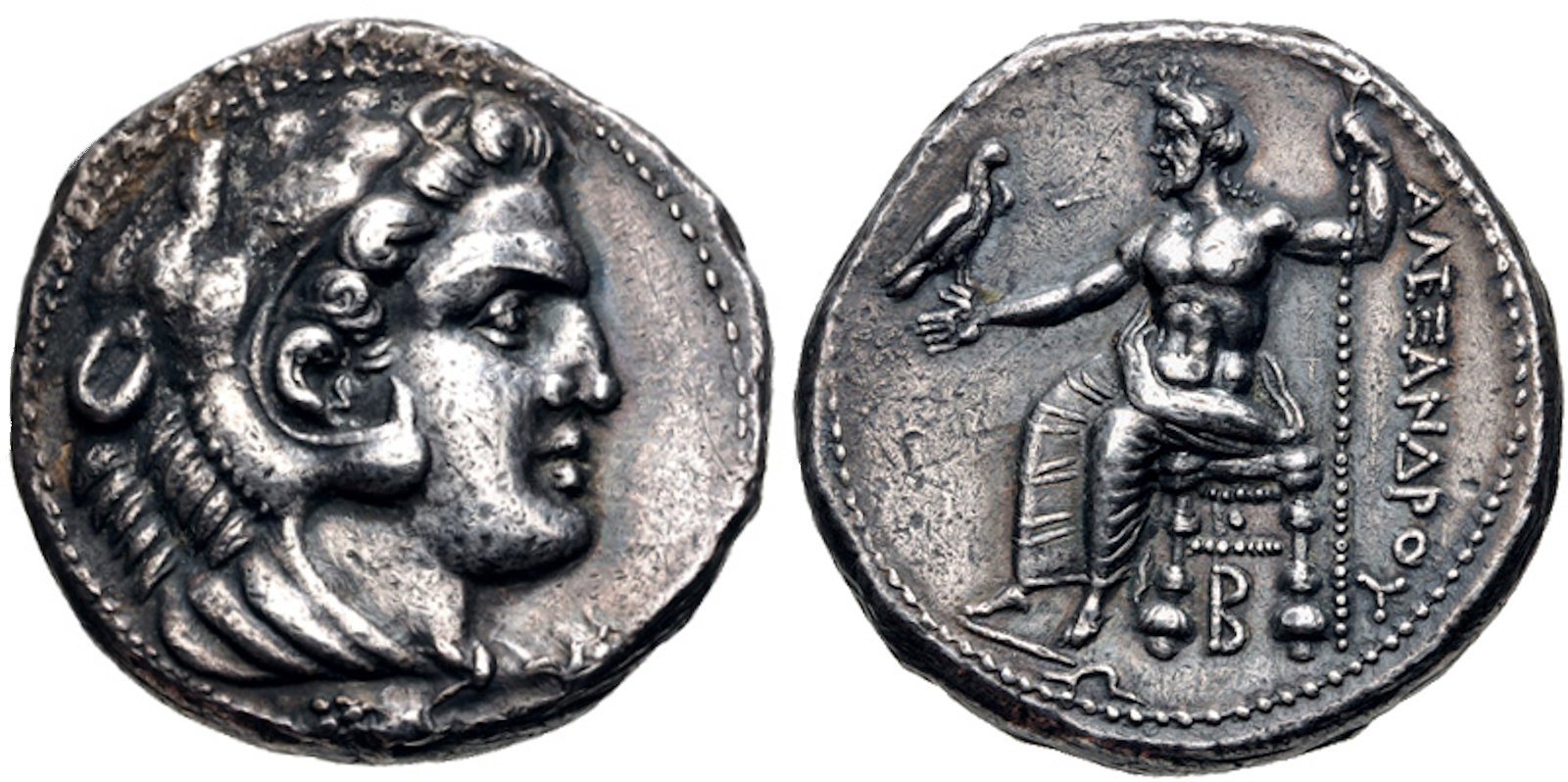
Coinage of Alexander the Great struck under Balakros or Menes circa 333-327 BC. The letter "B" appears under the throne of Zeus.

Balakros (Greek: Bάλακρoς), also Balacrus or Balagros, the son of Nicanor, one of Alexander the Great's "Somatophylakes" (bodyguards), was appointed satrap of Cilicia after the Battle of Issus, 333 BC. He succeeded to the last Achaemenid satrap of Cilicia, Arsames.

== Career ==
Balakros completed the conquest of Asia Minor together with Calas, satrap of Hellespontine Phrygia, and Antigonus, satrap of Phrygia.

It was probably this Balacrus who married Phila, the daughter of Antipater, and subsequently the wife of Craterus.

He was probably supervised by Menes from 331 BC, who held the position of Hyparch or Strategoi for the area from Babylon to the satrapies of Syria, Phoenicia, and Cilicia.

He fell in battle against the Pisidians in the lifetime of Alexander. His death is variously placed circa 328 BC or 323 BC.

== Coinage ==
Balacrus is among several Hellenistic satraps who continued to use an Achaemenid type for their coinage, complete with the local deity of Tarsus, Baal. His coinage bore his name, and later only his initial "B". This coinage is said to have influenced Alexander's imperial coinage, which was initially minted in the same mints. The Imperial coinage of Alexander is often said to have been started in Tarsos circa 333–327, under the rule of either Balacrus or Menes.

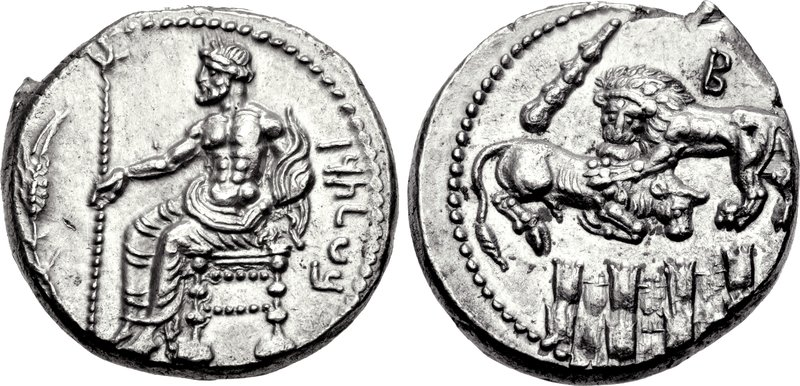
Coin of Balacrus, as Satrap of Cilicia. Tarsos, 333-323 BC. Baaltars in Aramaic to right on the obverse, letter "B" on the reverse.

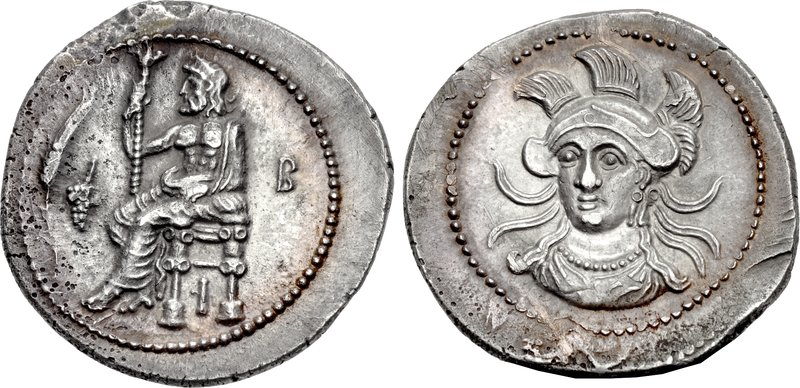
Coin of Balacrus, as Satrap of Cilicia. Issus, 333-323 BC. Overstruck on a coin of Achaemenid satrap Tiribazus minted in Tarsos. Letter "B" on the obverse.

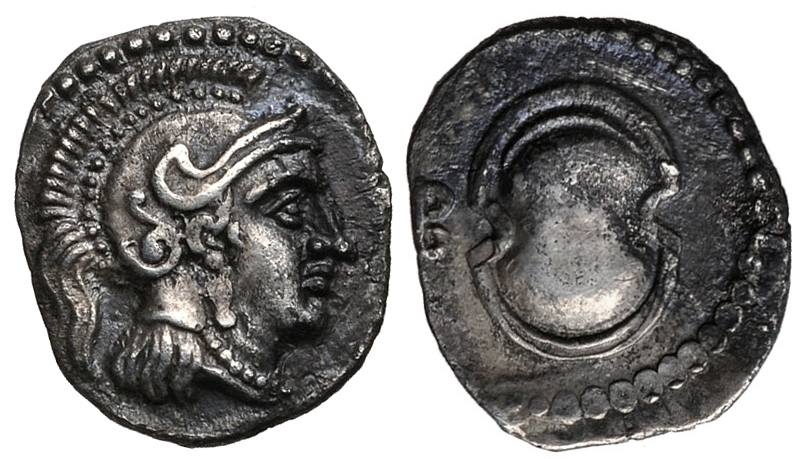
Coin of Balakros, Satrap of Cilicia, with letter "B". Tarsos. 333-323 BC

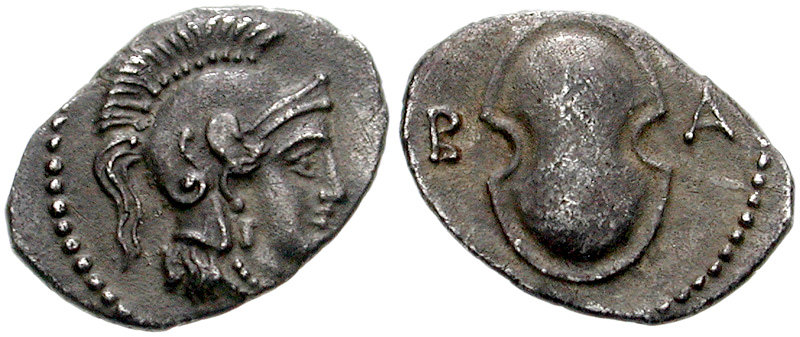
Possible coinage of Balakros, with the letters "B-A".
