= Craterus (historian) =

Macedonian governor of Corinth

Craterus the Macedonian (Ancient Greek: Κρατερός ὁ Μακεδών, romanized: Krateros ho Makedōn; 321 – c. 263 BC) was a Macedonian historian, who produced a compilation of fifth century BC Athenian inscriptions.

== Life ==
In the 19th century, Meineke, Cobet, and Krech identified Craterus with the son of Alexander the Great's general Craterus and his wife Phila. This individual became the stepson of Demetrius Poliorcetes and the half-brother of Antigonus II Gonatas following his mother's third marriage. When Antigonus became king of Macedon, Craterus was made governor of Corinth and Chalcis. He loyally ruled Corinth from 280 BC until his death. Craterus had a son named Alexander who achieved the governorship of Corinth and Euboea after his death, but around 253 BC resolved to challenge the Macedonian supremacy and seek independence as a tyrant.

This identification of the historian with Craterus the son of the general was first challenged in 1955 by Felix Jacoby and is no longer widely accepted. It is rejected by the most recent editors of Craterus' fragments, Donatella Erdas and Edwin Carawan. Jacoby proposed that he was a peripatetic contemporary of Theophrastus, writing in the mid-fourth century BC. This argument is supported by the fact that Craterus' work seems not to have extended beyond the end of the fifth century.

== Works ==
As a historian Craterus distinguished himself as a diligent compiler of documents relating to the history of Attica. He made a collection of Attic inscriptions, containing decrees of the people (psephismaton synagoge) and out of them he seems to have constructed a diplomatic history of Athens. This work is frequently referred to by Harpocration and Stephanus of Byzantium. With the exception of the statements contained in these and other passages, the work of Craterus is lost.

== Bibliography ==
- Carawan, Edwin (2007). "Krateros the Macedonian (342)". In Worthington, Ian (ed.). Jacoby Online. Brill's New Jacoby, Part III. Leiden: Brill. doi:10.1163/1873-5363_bnj2_a342.
- Carawan, Edwin (2017). "Krateros the Macedonian (342)". In Worthington, Ian (ed.). Jacoby Online. Brill's New Jacoby - Second Edition, Part III. Leiden: Brill. doi:10.1163/1873-5363_bnj2_a342.
- Erdas, Donatella (2002). Cratero, il Macedone : testimonianze e frammenti. Tivoli: TORED. ISBN 8888617094.
- Harris, Edward (2021). "The Work of Craterus and the Documents in the Attic Orators and in the "Lives of the Ten Orators"". Klio. 103 (2): 463–504. doi:10.1515/klio-2020-1024.
- Higbie, Carolyn (1999). "Craterus and the Use of Inscriptions in Ancient Scholarship". Transactions of the American Philological Association. 129: 43–83. doi:10.2307/284424. ISSN 0360-5949. JSTOR 284424.
