= Menes of Pella =

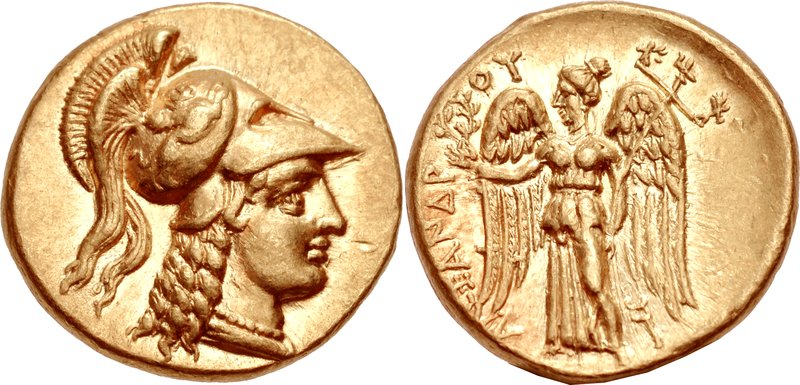
Coinage of Alexander the Great 336-323 BC, Tarsos mint, struck under Balakros or Menes, circa 332/1-327 BC.

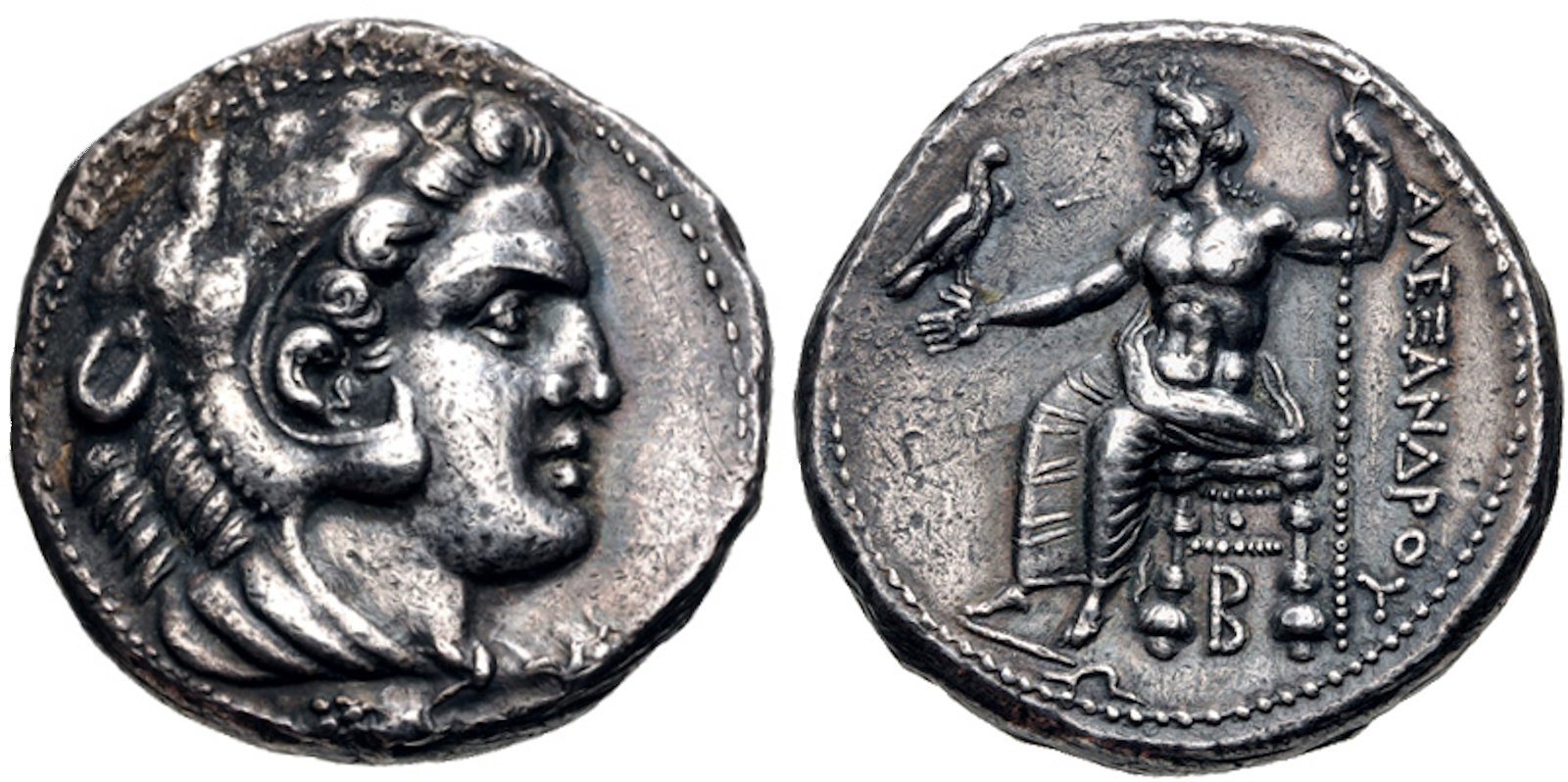
Coinage of Alexander the Great struck under Balakros or Menes circa 333-327 BC.

Menes of Pella (Ancient Greek: Μένης), son of Dionysius, was one of the Greek officers of Alexander the Great; and after the Battle of Issus (333 BC) was admitted by the king into the number of his somatophylakes, in the place of Balacrus, who was promoted to the satrapy of Cilicia.

In 331 BC, after Alexander had occupied Susa, he sent Menes down to the Mediterranean to take the government of Syria, Phoenicia, and Cilicia, entrusting him at the same time with 3000 talents, a portion of which he was to transmit to Antipater for his war with the Lacedaemonians. He was a Hyparch, and in this position, he may have been responsible for overseeing the existing administration as far as Cilicia. Apollodorus of Amphipolis was joined with him in this command.

He issued coinage, often bearing his initial "M".

His successor is unknown, and his position may have only been temporary, to managed conquered territory in the west while Alexander was campaigning further east.
