= Peithagoras =

Peithagoras (Greek: Πειθαγόρας) was a Macedonian seer and general from Amphipolis, brother of Apollodorus. According to Aristobulus of Cassandreia, Apollodorus, having joined Alexander the Great on his return from his Indian expedition and accompanied him to Ecbatana, imagined that he had grounds for dreading his displeasure, and wrote therefore to Peithagoras at Babylon, to inquire whether any danger threatened him from Alexander or Hephaestion. The answer was that he had nothing to fear from Hephaestion, who (so the victims portended) would soon be removed out of his way. The next day Hephaestion's death took place (324 BC) and not long after Apollodorus received the same message from Peithagoras with respect to Alexander. Peithagoras is also said to have predicted the deaths of Perdiccas and Antigonus.
