= Apollodorus of Amphipolis =

Apollodorus (Greek: Ἀπολλόδωρος) from Amphipolis was one of the cavalry generals of Alexander the Great, who commanded the force Alexander left behind with the Babylonian governor Mazaeus. He was entrusted in 331 BC, together with Menes of Pella, with the administration of Babylon and of all the satrapies as far as Cilicia. Alexander also gave them 1000 talents to collect as many troops as they could.

The historian Arrian recounts the following story about Apollodorus, originally told by Alexander's engineer Aristobulus of Cassandreia: Apollodorus had a brother named Pythagoras (or Pithagoras or Peithagoras) who was a hepatomancer – that is, a fortune-teller who read the future in the examination of the livers of different animals – whom Apollodorus consulted over his own future. When Pythagoras, corresponding by letter, asked his brother whom was he worried about, Apollodorus said it was Alexander and Hephaestion, owing the purges these two were enacting against many whom they'd appointed to office. Pythagoras predicted that Hephaestion would soon die, which he later did.
