= Phila (daughter of Seleucus) =

Queen of ancient Macedonia

Phila (Greek: Φίλα; after 300 BC – after 246 BC) was a queen (basilissa) of ancient Macedonia. She was a daughter of Seleucus I Nicator, the founder of the Seleucid Empire, and Stratonice. In 277 or 276 BC, she became the wife of her uncle Antigonus II Gonatas, king of Macedonia, and was mother of Demetrius II Aetolicus (born 275 BC). She was given to Antigonus by her brother, later Antiochus I king of the Seleucid Empire. She had been placed in his care in 294 or 293 BC. This was done by way of Antiochus formally giving up his claim to Macedonia and recognising Antigonus as king there following an alliance opposing him between Antigonus and Nicomedes I of Bithynia.

Phila's wedding was used by Antigonus to emphasise that his rule was a return to the old Argead dynasty and cement his legitimacy. Phila had no formal role in the governance of the country, but there is evidence that she had influence. Unusually for Hellenistic rulers who were often polygamous, Antigonus married only Phila. The poet Aratus wrote a hymn for the wedding and an epigram for Phila.

A statue of Phila was erected on the island of Delos. She frequently visited the sanctuary of Apollo on the island, apparently copying a habit of her mother. On the island of Samos, Phila had a temenos, a holy precinct under official control. There may have been a cult for Phila on the island.
