= Nicaea of Corinth =

Macedonian queen (active 245 BCE)

Nicaea (Ancient Greek: Νίκαια; fl. 245 BC), was the spouse of Alexander of Corinth, and ruler of Corinth after his death. She was married to the future king Demetrius II of Macedon.

Nicaea married Alexander, tyrant of Corinth and governor of Euboea in circa 260 BC during the reign of Antigonus Gonatas.

Her husband Alexander died in 247 BC. After the death of her husband, who was thought to have been poisoned by the command of Gonatas, Nicaea retained possession of the important fortress of Corinth.

In 245/244 BC, Antigonus lulled her into security by offering her the hand of his son Demetrius in marriage, and took the opportunity during the nuptial festivities to surprise the citadel. She married Demetrius after her defeat, though her life after marriage is unknown.

She is probably the same person mentioned in the Suda (s.v. Euphorion) as patronising the poet Euphorion of Chalcis, though the compiler calls her husband only ruler of Euboea.
