= Nicanor (father of Balacrus) =

Father of Balacrus, Macedonian satrap of Cilicia

Nicanor (/naɪˈkeɪnər/; Greek: Nικάνωρ Nīkā́nōr; lived 4th century BC) was the father of Balacrus, the Macedonian satrap of Cilicia. It is probably this Nicanor who is alluded to in an anecdote related by Plutarch of Philip II of Macedon, as a person of some distinction during the reign of that monarch.
