= Zopyrus (disambiguation) =

Zopyrus (/ˈzoʊpɪrəs/; Ancient Greek: Ζώπυρος, Zōpyros) may refer to:

- Zopyrus (6th century BC), a Persian satrap of Babylon mentioned in Herodotus' Histories
- Zopyrus II, grandson of the satrap and son of Megabyzus and Amytis
- Zopyrus of Tarentum, an engineer and Pythagorean (5th century BC) credited with the invention of two advanced forms of the gastraphetes and the protagonist of the novel The Arrows of Hercules (1965)
- Zopyrus of Heraclea, author of three Orphic poems whose authorship is also ascribed to Brontinus, The Net, The Robe and The Krater (possibly the same as Zopyrus of Tarentum, or possibly as early as the 6th century BC)
- Zopyrus (physiognomist) (5th century BC), a physiognomist (possibly the same as the Thracian tutor of Alcibiades mentioned in the Platonic First Alcibiades, 122b)(see also, Cicero's De Fato V)
- Zopyrus (dialogue), a dialogue by Phaedo of Elis, in which Zopyrus the physiognomist practices his art on Socrates
- Zopyros perikaiomenos (Zopyrus on Fire), a comedy by Strattis
- Zopyrus of Clazomenae (early 3rd century BC), credited with introducing the rhetorical concept of stasis
- Zopyrus of Magnesia (ca. 300 BC?), proponent of singing Homeric poetry in the Aeolic dialect and probable author of a history (FGrHist 494), The Foundation of Miletus, cited in the scholium to Iliad 10.274
- Zopyrus, a soldier of Antigonus II Gonatas (3rd century BC) said to have killed Pyrrhus of Epirus
- Zopyrus (silversmith) (1st century BC)
- Zopyrus (physician) (1st century BC), teacher of Apollonius of Citium at Alexandria
- Zopyrus of Gordium (1st century AD), a physician and acquaintance of Scribonius Largus, from Gordium (or perhaps Gortyn), possibly to be identified with the Epicurean speaker in Plutarch's Symposiaca
- Zopyrus (Bishop of Barca), present at the First Council of Nicaea in AD 325: see Cyrenaica and Barca
- Aurelios Zopyros (4th century AD), the last reported athlete at the Ancient Olympic Games
