= Stratonice of Macedon =

Stratonice (Greek: Στρατονίκη, Stratoníkē; lived in the 3rd century BC) of Macedonia was the daughter of Stratonice of Syria and of the Seleucid king Antiochus I Soter (281–261 BC). She was married to Demetrius II (239–229 BC), king of Macedonia.

== Biography ==
Stratonice bore Demetrius II a daughter called Apama. The period of their marriage is unknown; but she appears to have remained in Macedonia until about 239 BC, when she left Demetrius in disgust, on account of his second marriage to Phthia, the daughter of Olympias, and retired to Syria. Here she in vain incited her nephew Seleucus II Callinicus (246–225 BC) to avenge the insult offered her by declaring war against the Macedonian king. According to another account, she was hoping to induce Seleucus himself to marry her; but that monarch was wholly occupied with the recovery of Babylonia and the upper provinces of the empire. While he was thus engaged, Stratonice took advantage of his absence to raise a revolt against him at Antioch; but she was easily expelled from that city on the return of Seleucus, and took refuge in Seleucia, where she was besieged, taken prisoner, and put to death.
