= Phila (daughter of Antipater) =

Daughter of the regent of Macedonia (died 287 BC)

- Died: 287 BC; Cassandreia
- Spouse: Balacrus; Craterus; Demetrius I of Macedon
- Father: Antipater

Phila (Greek: Φίλα; died 287 BC), daughter of Antipater, the regent of Macedonia, is celebrated by the ancient sources as one of the noblest and most virtuous women of the age in which she lived. Her abilities and judgment were so conspicuous even at an early age, that her father, Antipater, often consulted her in regard to political affairs.

== Biography ==
According to Antonius Diogenes, she was married to Balacrus (probably the satrap of Cappadocia of that name) as early as 332 BC. In 322 BC, her father gave her in marriage to Craterus as a reward for his assistance to Antipater in the Lamian War. After the death of Craterus a year later, she was again married to the young Demetrius Poliorcetes, the son of Antigonus.

Her marriage to Demetrius may have been as early as 319 BC; according to Diodorus it had already happened in 315, when the remains of her previous husband were consigned to her care by Ariston, the friend of Eumenes. Despite the large difference in age, Phila appears to have had great influence over her youthful husband, who treated her with the utmost respect and consideration, and towards whom she had great affection in spite of his numerous amours and subsequent marriages. During the many vicissitudes of fortune which Demetrius experienced, Phila seems to have resided principally in Cyprus from whence she sent letters and costly presents to her husband during the siege of Rhodes.

After the Battle of Ipsus, she joined Demetrius, who sent her to her brother Cassander in Macedonia, to endeavour to effect a reconciliation and treaty between him and Demetrius. She appears to have again returned to Cyprus, where, in 295 BC, she was besieged in Salamis by the king of Egypt Ptolemy I, and ultimately compelled to surrender, but was treated by him in the most honourable manner and sent together with her children in safety to Macedonia. Here she now shared the fortunes of her husband, and contributed to efforts to secure the loyalty of the Macedonian people. But when, in 287 BC, a sudden revolution once more precipitated Demetrius from the throne, Phila, unable to bear this unexpected reversal of fortunes and despairing of the future, took her own life at Cassandreia.

== Marriages and children ==
- Her first husband was Balakros (ca. 332 BC)
- Her second husband was Craterus (322 BC), with whom she had a son:
  - Craterus (320-250)
- Her last marriage was to Demetrius I of Macedon with whom she had two children:
  - Stratonice of Syria
  - Antigonus II Gonatas

== Legacy ==
Phila exerted her influence in the cause of peace, in protecting the oppressed, and in attempting to calm the violent passions of those who surrounded her. She left two children by Demetrius; Antigonus, surnamed Gonatas, who became king of Macedonia; and a daughter, Stratonice, married first to Seleucus I Nicator, and afterwards to his son Antiochus I Soter. She also had a son by Craterus, who bore his father's name. The Athenians, in order to pay their court to Demetrius, consecrated a temple to Phila, under the name of Aphrodite.
