= Halcyoneus =

Macedonian prince and general (3rd century BC)

- Dynasty: Antigonid
- Father: Antigonus II Gonatas

Halcyoneus or Alcyoneus (Greek: Ἀλκυονεύς, Alkyoneús; fl. 3rd century BC) was, as a son of Antigonus II Gonatas, king of Macedonia, a Macedonian prince of the Antigonid dynasty. He participated, with his father and Macedon's Spartan allies, in the fight against Pyrrhus of Epirus for control of the Peloponnese, and died in battle at an unspecified later date.

== Life ==
=== War with Pyrrhus ===
Nothing is known of the time of his birth, although his mother may have been the Athenian courtesan Demo who became his father's mistress. He was already grown up to manhood in 272 BC, when Antigonus advanced into the Peloponnesus to oppose the invasion of Pyrrhus, king of Epirus, and he accompanied his father on that expedition. During the night attack on Argos, by which Pyrrhus attempted to force his way into the city, Halcyoneus was dispatched by Antigonus with a body of troops to oppose him, and a vehement combat took place in the streets. In the midst of the confusion, word was brought to Halcyoneus that Pyrrhus was slain; he hastened to the spot, and arrived just as Zopyrus had cut off the head of the fallen monarch, which Halcyoneus carried in triumph to his father. Antigonus upbraided him for his barbarity, and drove him angrily from his presence. Taught by this lesson, when he soon after fell in with Helenus, the son of Pyrrhus, he treated him with respect, and conducted him in safety to Antigonus.

=== Later life ===
It appears from an anecdote told by Aelian and Plutarch that Halcyoneus was killed in battle during the lifetime of Antigonus, but on what occasion they do not say.

== Sources ==
Ancient

- Plutarch, Vitae Parallelae 16, "Pyrrhus" 34.4–6.
- Plutarch, Moralia 119d, "Consolatio ad Apollonium" 33.
- Diogenes Laërtius, Vitae Philosophorum 4.1.41, 7.36.
- Aelian, Varia Historia 3.5.
- Athenaeus, Deipnosophistae 13.40.
- Valerius Maximus 5.1e.4.
- Pausanias, De Situ Graeciae 2.6.

Modern

- Bengtson, Hermann (1975). Herrschergestalten des Hellenismus. Munich: C. H. Beck. pp. 106, 158, 161.
- Bunbury, Edward Herbert (1867). "Halcyoneus". A Dictionary of Greek and Roman Biography and Mythology. Vol. 2. Boston, MA: Little, Brown and Company. p. 325.
- Droysen, Johann Gustav (1998). Geschichte des Hellenismus. Vol. 3. pp. 128, 139, 141, 154.
- Gabbert, Janice J. (2004). Antigonus II Gonatas: A Political Biography. New York, NY: Routledge. Taylor & Francis e-Library. pp. 4, 15.
- O'Neil, James L. (2003). "The Ethnic Origins of the Friends of the Antigonid Kings of Macedon". The Classical Quarterly. 53 (2): 512, note 21. JSTOR 3556219.
- "Halcyoneus". Brill's New Pauly (online ed.). 2006. doi:10.1163/1574-9347_bnp_e502190.

== Links ==
- "265 B.C. Olympiad 128.4". Attalus. 2023.
- "Halcyoneus – in ancient sources". Attalus. 2021.
- "Halkyoneus Prinz von Makedonien". Mittelalter.
