= Stratonice of Syria =

Queen of the Seleucid Empire (300 – 294 and 282 – 261 BCE)

Stratonice
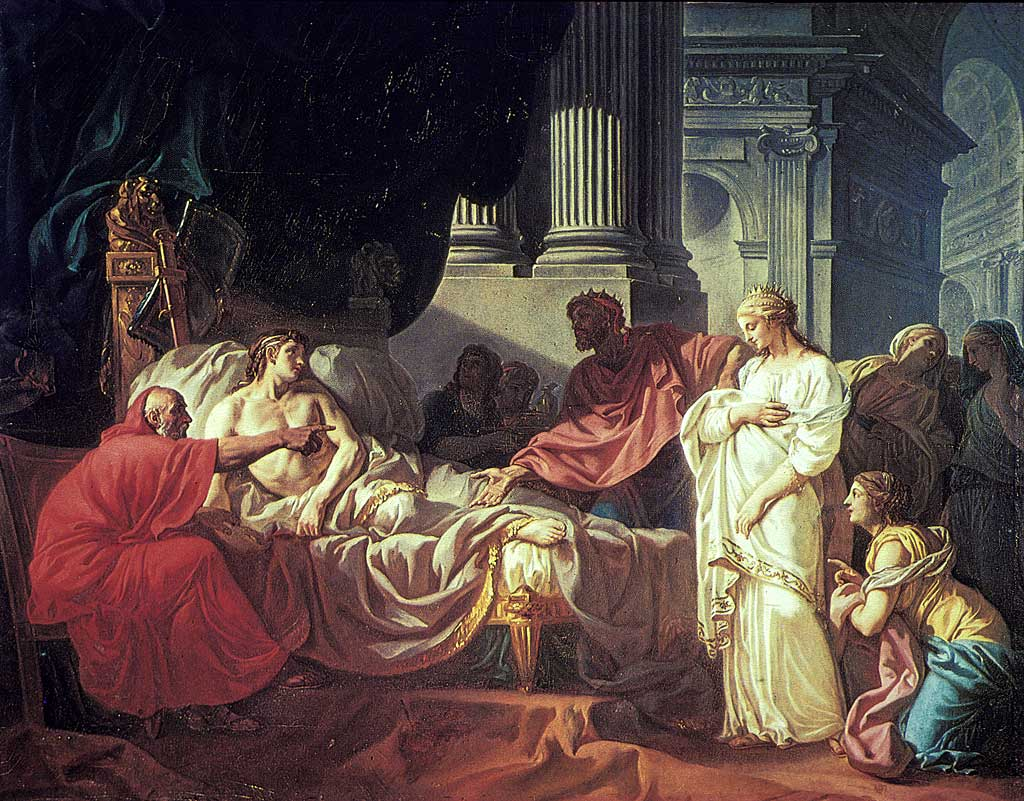
- Antiochus I and Stratonice by Jacques-Louis David (1774)

Queen consort of the Seleucid Empire
- Tenure: 300–294 BC; 281–261 BC
- Coronation: 300 BC at Rhosus, on the Pierian coast in Macedonia
- Born: c. 320 BC
- Died: September/October 254 BC (aged 65 or 66); Sardis (now Sart, Salihli, Manisa, Turkey)
- Spouse: Seleucus I Nicator (300–294 BC); Antiochus I Soter (294–261 BC)
- Issue: Phila; Seleucus; Laodice; Apama II; Stratonice II; Antiochus II Theos
- House: Antigonid
- Father: Demetrius Poliorcetes
- Mother: Phila

Stratonice or Stratonica of Syria (Ancient Greek: Στρατoνίκη, Stratoníkē, "victory of the army", c. 320 BC – 254 BC) was Queen of the Seleucid Empire from 300 BC until 294 BC and from 281 BC until 261 BC.

== Biography ==
Stratonice of Syria was the daughter of king Demetrius Poliorcetes and Phila, the daughter of Antipater. In 300 BC, at which time she could not have been more than seventeen years of age, her hand in marriage was sought by Seleucus, king of the Seleucid Empire. She was accompanied by her father Demetrius to Rhosus (on the Pierian coast in Macedonia) where the nuptials were celebrated. Notwithstanding the disparity of their ages, she appears to have lived in perfect harmony with the old king for some years. Seleucus and Stratonice had one child, a daughter Phila, when it was discovered that her stepson Antiochus was deeply enamoured of her.

In order to save the life of his son (which was supposedly endangered by the violence of his passion), Seleucus gave up Stratonice in marriage to him in 294 BC. At the same time Seleucus announced that Antiochus would be king of the eastern provinces. It is believed that the union, which produced five children, was a prosperous one. Antiochus named the city of Stratonikeia in Caria after Stratonice.

In Babylonian texts, she is referred to as 'Astartanikku', a transliteration of her Greek name that seems to have been designed in order to draw a parallel with the goddess Astarte. She is also given titles that were otherwise reserved for Babylonian goddesses.

Stratonice's death at Sardis is mentioned in the Astronomical Diaries in September or October 254 BC.

== Stratonice's children ==
By Seleucus I Nicator:

- Phila, who later married her uncle Antigonus II Gonatas.

By Antiochus I Soter:

- Seleucus, who was executed for rebellion.
- Laodice
- Apama II, who married Magas of Cyrene and was mother of Berenice II of Egypt.
- Stratonice II, who married her nephew/cousin Demetrius II Aetolicus (Phila's son by Antigonus II).
- Antiochus II Theos, who succeeded his father as king.

== Bibliography ==
- Smith, William (editor); Dictionary of Greek and Roman Biography and Mythology, "Stratonice (3)", Boston, (1867)
