= Seleucus I Nicator =

Macedonian general, Diadochus, and founder of the Seleucid Empire

- Basileus (Note: King of Persia King of Kings King of the Lands Lord of Asia)
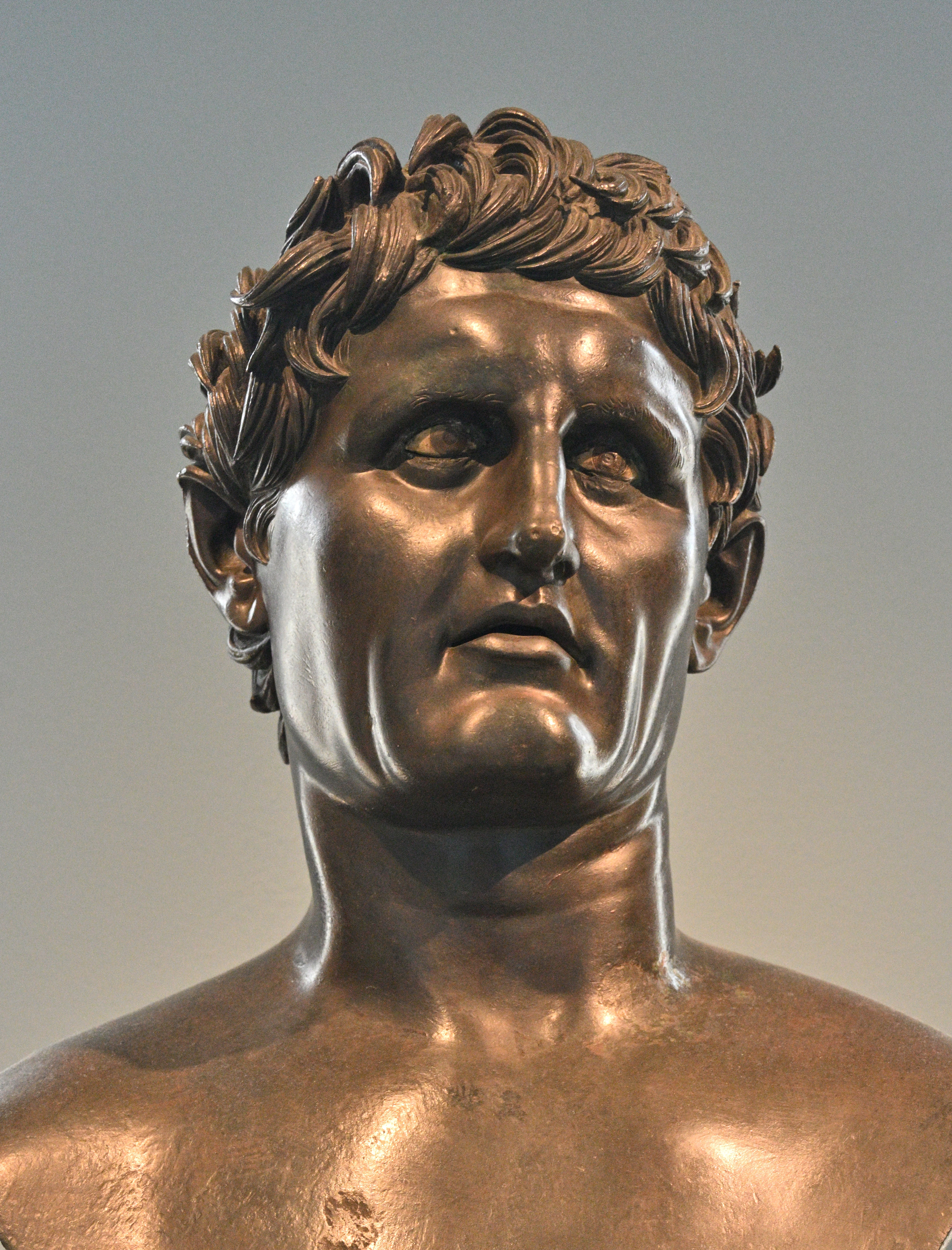
- Roman copy of a bronze statue of Seleucus found in Herculaneum (now located at the Naples National Archaeological Museum)

Basileus of the Seleucid Empire
- Reign: 305 – September 281 BC
- Predecessor: Alexander IV
- Successor: Antiochus I Soter (co-ruler from c. 292 BC)
- Born: c. 358 BC; Europus, Macedon (modern-day Evropos, Greece)
- Died: September 281 BC (aged c. 77); Lysimachia, Thrace (modern-day Kavakköy, Çanakkale, Turkey)
- Spouse: Apama; Stratonice
- Issue: Antiochus I Soter; Achaeus; Phila; Laodice
- Dynasty: Seleucid
- Father: Antiochus
- Mother: Laodice
- Military career
- Conflicts: Wars of Alexander the Great; Wars of the Diadochi; Third War of the Diadochi; Battle of Gaza (312 BC); Babylonian War; First siege of Babylon; Battle of the Tigris; Third siege of Babylon; Battle of the 25 of Abu; Fourth War of the Diadochi; Battle of Ipsus; The Struggle between Lysimachus and Seleucus; Battle of Corupedium; Seleucid–Mauryan War

Seleucus I Nicator (/sɪˈluːkəs/; Greek: Σέλευκος Νικάτωρ, Séleukos Nikátōr, (Note: Attic Greek pronunciation: [sé.leu̯.kos ni.ká.to:r]) "Seleucus the Victorious"; c. 358 BC – 281 BC) was a Macedonian Greek general, officer and successor of Alexander the Great who founded the eponymous Seleucid Empire of the Seleucid Dynasty. Initially a secondary player in the power struggles following Alexander's death, Seleucus rose to become the total ruler of Asia Minor, Syria, Mesopotamia, and the Iranian plateau, assuming the title of basileus (king). The Seleucid Empire was one of the major powers of the Hellenistic world, until it was overcome by the Roman Republic and Parthian Empire in the late second and early first centuries BC.

While serving under Alexander, Seleucus was commander of the Hypaspistai, an elite Macedonian infantry unit. After the death of Alexander in June 323 BC, Seleucus initially supported Perdiccas, the regent of Alexander's empire, and was appointed Commander of the Companions and chiliarch at the Partition of Babylon in 323 BC. However, after the outbreak of the Wars of the Diadochi in 322, Perdiccas' military failures against Ptolemy in Egypt led to the mutiny of his troops in Pelusium. Perdiccas was betrayed and assassinated in a conspiracy by Seleucus, Peithon and Antigenes in Pelusium sometime in either 321 or 320 BC. At the Partition of Triparadisus in 321 BC, Seleucus was appointed Satrap of Babylon under the new regent Antipater. But almost immediately, the wars between the Diadochi resumed and one of the most powerful of the Diadochi, Antigonus, forced Seleucus to flee Babylon. Seleucus was only able to return to Babylon in 312 BC with the support of Ptolemy. From 312 BC, Seleucus ruthlessly expanded his dominions and eventually conquered the Persian and Median lands. Seleucus ruled not only Babylonia, but the entire eastern part of Alexander's empire.

Seleucus further made claim to the former satrapies in Gandhara and in northwest India. However these ambitions were contested by Chandragupta Maurya, resulting in the Seleucid–Mauryan War (305–303 BC). The conflict was ultimately resolved by a treaty resulting in the Maurya Empire annexing the eastern satrapies. Additionally, a marriage alliance was formed, with Chandragupta marrying a daughter of Seleucus, according to Strabo and Appian. Furthermore, the Seleucid Empire received a considerable military force of 500 war elephants with mahouts, which would play a decisive role against Antigonus at the Battle of Ipsus in 301 BC. In 281 BC, Seleucus also defeated Lysimachus at the Battle of Corupedium, adding Asia Minor to his empire.

Seleucus' victories against Antigonus and Lysimachus left the Seleucid dynasty virtually unopposed amongst the Diadochi. However, Seleucus also hoped to take control of Lysimachus' European territories, primarily Thrace and Macedon itself. But upon arriving in Thrace in 281 BC, Seleucus was assassinated by Ptolemy Ceraunus, who had taken refuge at the Seleucid court with his sister Lysandra. The assassination of Seleucus destroyed Seleucid prospects in Thrace and Macedon, and paved the way for Ptolemy Ceraunus to absorb much of Lysimachus' former power in Macedon. Seleucus was succeeded by his son Antiochus I as ruler of the Seleucid Empire. Seleucus founded a number of new cities during his reign, including Antioch (300 BC), Edessa and Seleucia on the Tigris (c. 305 BC), a foundation that eventually depopulated Babylon.

== Youth and family ==
Seleucus was the son of Antiochus. Historian Junianus Justinus claims that Antiochus was one of Philip II of Macedon's generals, but no such general is mentioned in any other sources, and nothing is known of his supposed career under Philip. It is possible that Antiochus was a member of an upper Macedonian noble family. Seleucus' mother was supposedly called Laodice, but nothing else is known of her. Later, Seleucus named a number of cities after his parents. Seleucus was born in Europus, located in the northern part of Macedonia. Just a year before his birth (if the year 358 BC is accepted as the most likely date), the Paeonians invaded the region. Philip defeated the invaders and only a few years later utterly subdued them under Macedonian rule. Seleucus' year of birth is unclear. Justin claims he was 77 years old during the battle of Corupedium, which would place his year of birth at 358 BC. Appian tells us Seleucus was 73 years old during the battle, which means 354 BC would be the year of birth. Eusebius of Caesarea, however, mentions the age of 75, and thus the year 356 BC, making Seleucus the same age as Alexander the Great. This is most likely propaganda on Seleucus' part to make him seem comparable to Alexander.

As a teenager, Seleucus was chosen to serve as the king's page (pais). It was customary for all male offspring of noble families to first serve in this position and later as officers in the king's army.

Seleucus, like his later rivals Antigonus and Demetrius, was reportedly a very powerful man. Appian wrote of an incident in which a wild bull that was about to be sacrificed by Alexander broke free of its bounds, and Seleucus managed to recapture the animal by grabbing and holding unto its horns with his bare hands. This was apparently the reason for the bull horns in the coins he later minted.

A number of legends, similar to those told of Alexander the Great, were told of Seleucus. It was said Antiochus told his son before he left to battle the Persians with Alexander that his real father was actually the god Apollo. The god had left a ring with a picture of an anchor as a gift to Laodice. Seleucus had a birthmark shaped like an anchor. It was told that Seleucus' sons and grandsons also had similar birthmarks. The story is similar to the one told about Alexander. Most likely the story is propaganda invented to present Seleucus as the natural successor of Alexander.

John Malalas tells us Seleucus had a sister called Didymeia, who had sons called Nicanor and Nicomedes. It is most likely the sons are fictitious. Didymeia might refer to the oracle of Apollo in Didyma near Miletus. It has also been suggested that Ptolemy (son of Seleucus) was actually the uncle of Seleucus.

== Early career under Alexander the Great ==
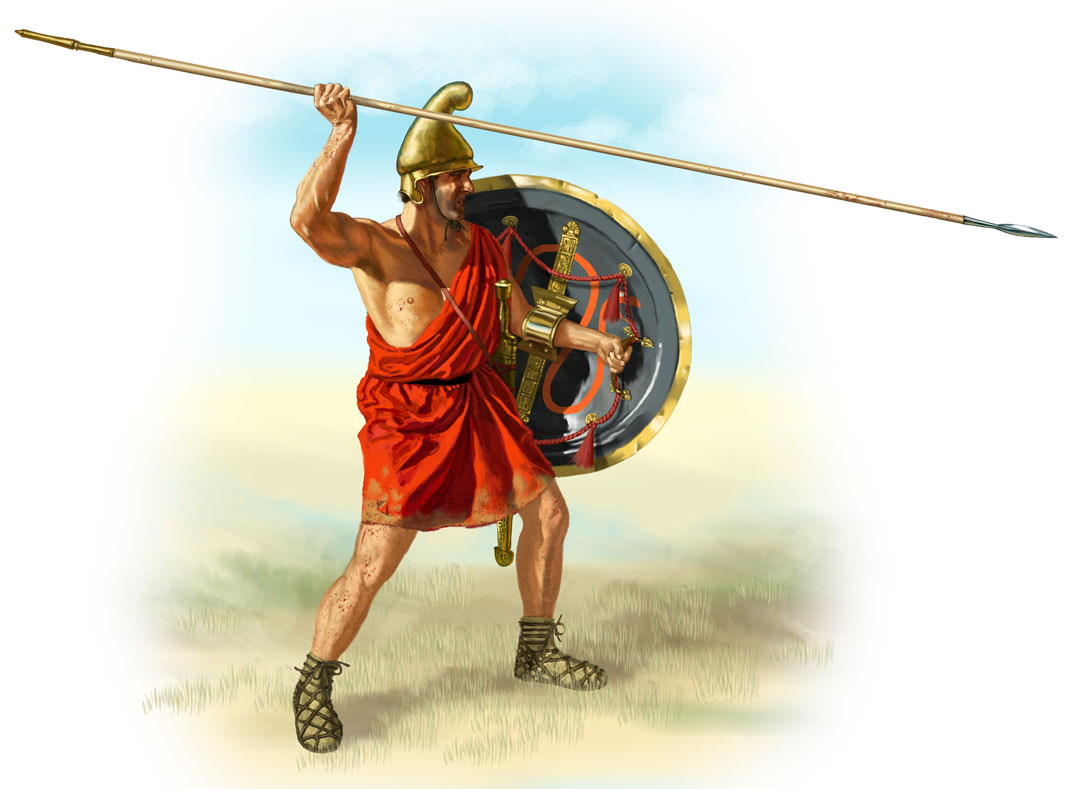
Seleucus led the Royal Hypaspistai during Alexander's Persian campaign.

In spring 334 BC, as a young man of about twenty-three, Seleucus accompanied Alexander into Asia. By the time of the Indian campaigns beginning in late in 327 BC, he had risen to the command of the elite infantry corps in the Macedonian army, the "Shield-bearers" (Hypaspistai, later known as the "Silvershields"). It is said by Arrian that when Alexander crossed the Hydaspes river on a boat, he was accompanied by Perdiccas, Ptolemy I Soter, Lysimachus and also Seleucus. During the subsequent Battle of the Hydaspes (326 BC), Seleucus led his troops against the elephants of King Porus. It is unknown the extent in which Seleucus participated in the actual planning of the battle, as he is not mentioned as holding any major independent position during the battle. This contrasts with Craterus, Hephaistion, Peithon and Leonnatus – each of whom had sizable detachments under their control. Seleucus' Royal Hypaspistai were constantly under Alexander's eye and at his disposal. They later participated in the Indus Valley campaign, in the battles fought against the Malli and in the crossing of the Gedrosian desert.

At the great marriage ceremony at Susa in the spring of 324 BC, Seleucus married Apama, daughter of Spitamenes. They had his eldest son and successor Antiochus I Soter, at least two legitimate daughters (Laodice and Phila) and possibly another son (Achaeus). At the same event, Alexander married the daughter of the late Persian King Darius III while several other Macedonians married Persian women. After Alexander's death (323 BC), when the other senior Macedonian officers unloaded their "Susa wives" en masse, Seleucus was one of the very few who kept his wife, and Apama remained his consort (later Queen) for the rest of her life.

Ancient sources report several anecdotes about Seleucus' activities during the life of Alexander. In the first of these episodes, he participated in a sailing trip near Babylon, where Alexander's diadem was blown off his head and landed on some reeds near the tombs of Assyrian kings. Seleucus swam to fetch the diadem back, placing it on his own head while returning to the boat to keep it dry. The validity of the story is dubious. In the second, he took part in the dinner party of Medeios the Thessalian with Alexander. The story of the dinner party of Medeios may be true, but the plot to poison the King is unlikely. In the final story, Seleucus reportedly slept in the temple of the god Serapis shortly before Alexander's death in the hope that his health might improve. The validity of this story is also questionable, as the Graeco-Egyptian Serapis had not yet been invented at the time.

== Senior officer under Perdiccas (323–321 BC) ==
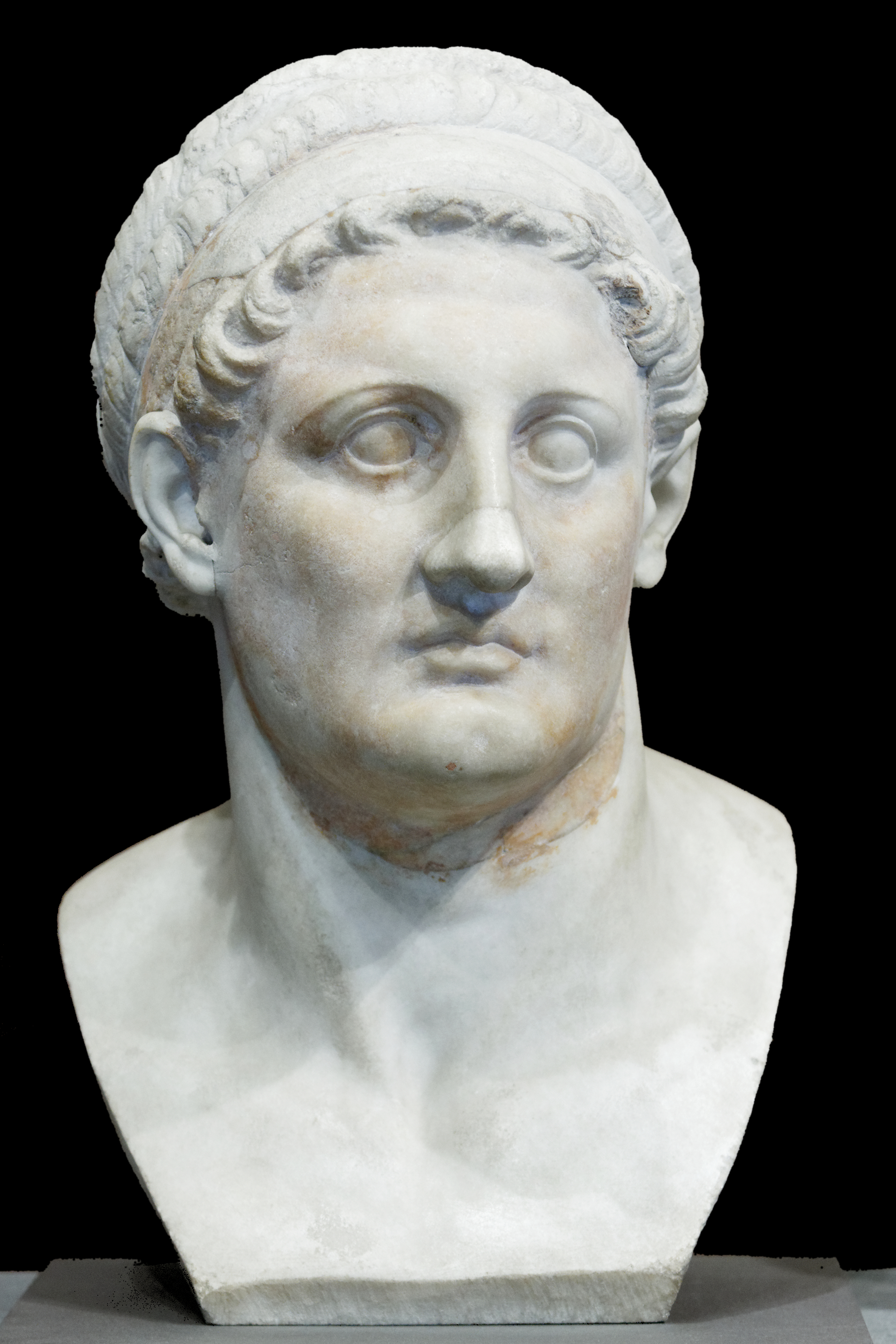
Ptolemy I Soter, an officer under Alexander the Great, was nominated as the satrap of Egypt. Ptolemy made Ptolemaic Egypt independent and proclaimed himself Basileus and Pharaoh in 305 BC.

Alexander the Great died without a successor in Babylon on June 10, 323 BC. His general Perdiccas became the regent of all of Alexander's empire, while Alexander's physically and mentally disabled half-brother Arrhidaeus was chosen as the next king under the name Philip III of Macedon. Alexander's unborn child (Alexander IV) was also named his father's successor. In the "Partition of Babylon" however, Perdiccas effectively divided the enormous Macedonian dominion among Alexander's generals. Seleucus was chosen to command the Companion cavalry (hetairoi) and appointed first or court chiliarch, which made him the senior officer in the Royal Army after the regent and commander-in-chief Perdiccas. Several other powerful men supported Perdiccas, including Ptolemy, Lysimachus, Peithon and Eumenes. Perdiccas' power depended on his ability to hold Alexander's enormous empire together, and on whether he could force the satraps to obey him.

War soon broke out between Perdiccas and the other Diadochi. To cement his position, Perdiccas tried to marry Alexander's sister Cleopatra. The First War of the Diadochi began when Perdiccas sent Alexander's corpse to Macedonia for burial. Ptolemy however captured the body and took it to Alexandria. Perdiccas and his troops followed him to Egypt, whereupon Ptolemy conspired with the satrap of Media, Peithon, and the commander of the Argyraspides, Antigenes, both serving as officers under Perdiccas, and assassinated him. Cornelius Nepos mentions that Seleucus also took part in this conspiracy, but this is not certain.

== Satrap of Babylonia (321–316 BC) ==
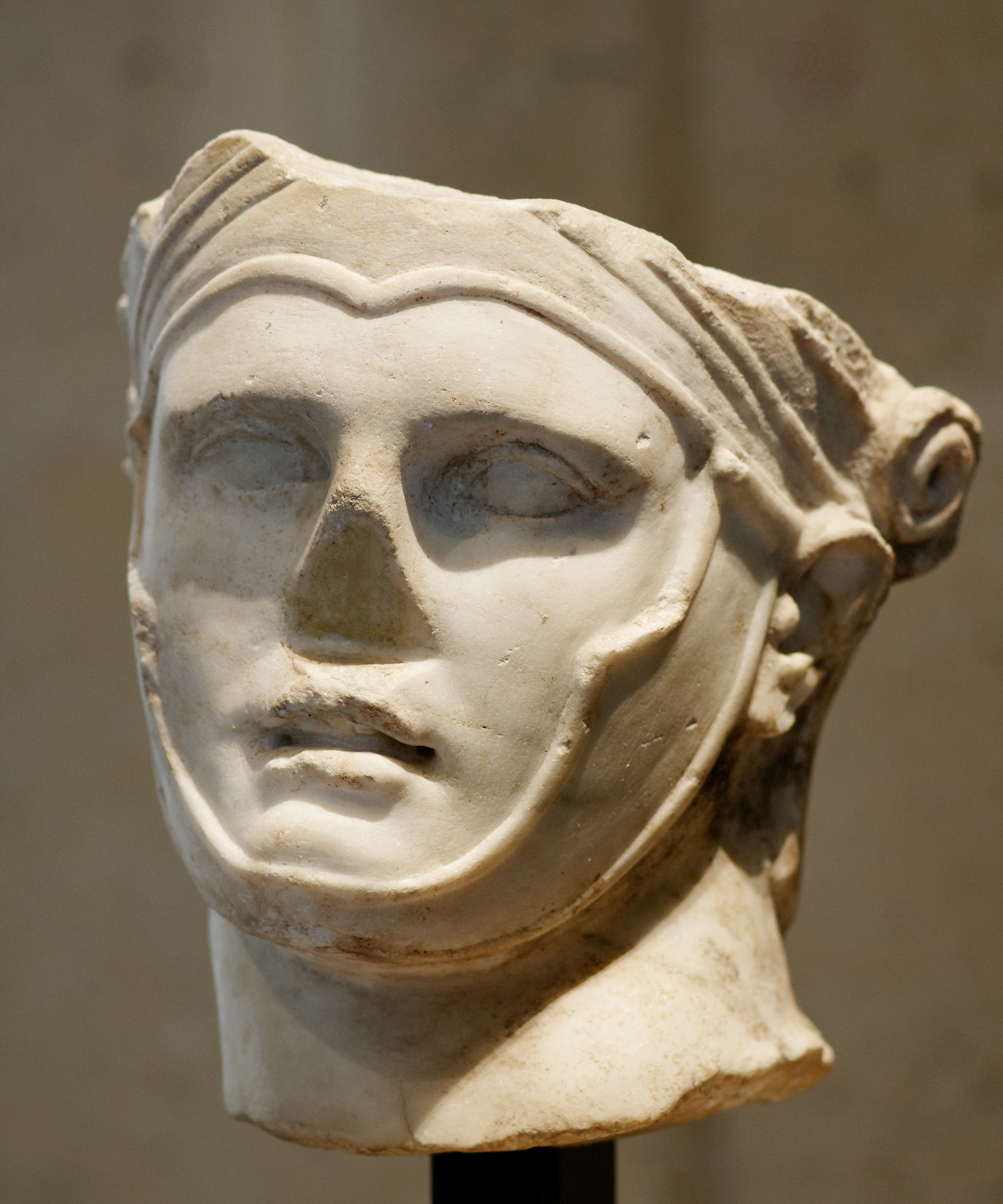
Bust attributed to Seleucus I Nicator, Roman Imperial artwork made in Syria from a Hellenistic model (c. 200 AD)

The most powerful man in the empire after the death of Perdiccas was Antipater. Perdiccas' opponents gathered in Triparadisos, where the empire of Alexander was partitioned again (the Treaty of Triparadisus 321 BC).

At Triparadisos the soldiers had become mutinous and were planning to murder their master Antipater. Seleucus and Antigonus, however, prevented this. Seleucus' participation in the conspiracy to kill Perdiccas has not been established but in the new settlement, he was awarded the rich province of Babylon. Some sources consider this his reward for his alleged betrayal. The decision, however, may have been Antigonus' idea. Seleucus' Babylon was surrounded by Peucestas, the satrap of Persis; Antigenes, the new satrap of Susiana and Peithon of Media. Babylon was one of the wealthiest provinces of the empire, but its military power was insignificant. It is possible that Antipater divided the eastern provinces so that no single satrap could rise above the others in power.

After the death of Alexander, Archon of Pella was chosen satrap of Babylon. Perdiccas, however, had plans to supersede Archon and nominate Docimus as his successor. During his invasion of Egypt, Perdiccas sent Docimus along with his detachments to Babylon. Archon waged war against him, but fell in battle. Thus, Docimus was not intending to give Babylon to Seleucus without a fight. It is not certain how Seleucus took Babylon from Docimus, but according to one Babylonian chronicle an important building was destroyed in the city during the summer or winter of 320 BC. Other Babylonian sources state that Seleucus arrived in Babylon in October or November 320 BC. Despite the presumed battle, Docimus was able to escape.

Meanwhile, the empire was once again in turmoil. Peithon, the satrap of Media, assassinated Philip, the satrap of Parthia, and replaced him with his brother Eudemus as the new satrap. In the west Antigonus and Eumenes waged war against each other. Just like Peithon and Seleucus, Eumenes was one of the former supporters of Perdiccas. Seleucus' biggest problem was, however, Babylon itself. The locals had rebelled against Archon and supported Docimus. The Babylonian priesthood had great influence over the region. Babylon also had a sizeable population of Macedonian and Greek veterans of Alexander's army. Seleucus won over the priests with monetary gifts and bribes.

=== Second War of the Diadochi ===
After the death of Antipater in 319 BC, the satrap of Media began to expand his power. Peithon assembled a large army of perhaps over 20,000 soldiers. Under the leadership of Peucestas the other satraps of the region brought together an opposing army of their own. Peithon was finally defeated in a battle waged in Parthia. He escaped to Media, but his opponents did not follow him and rather returned to Susiana. Meanwhile, Eumenes and his army had arrived at Cilicia, but had to retreat when Antigonus reached the city. The situation was difficult for Seleucus. Eumenes and his army were north of Babylon; Antigonus was following him with an even larger army; Peithon was in Media and his opponents in Susiana. Antigenes, satrap of Susiana and commander of the Argyraspides, was allied with Eumenes. Antigenes was in Cilicia when the war between him and Peithon began.

Peithon arrived at Babylon in the autumn or winter of 317 BC. Peithon had lost a large number of troops, but Seleucus had even fewer soldiers. Eumenes decided to march to Susa in the spring of 316 BC. The satraps in Susa had apparently accepted Eumenes' claims of his fighting on behalf of the lawful ruling family against the usurper Antigonus. Eumenes marched his army 300 stadions away from Babylon and tried to cross the Tigris. Seleucus had to act. He sent two triremes and some smaller ships to stop the crossing. He also tried to get the former hypasiti of the Argyraspides to join him, but this did not happen. Seleucus also sent messages to Antigonus. Because of his lack of troops, Seleucus apparently had no plans to face Eumenes in battle. He opened the flood barriers of the river, but the resulting flood did not stop Eumenes.

In the spring of 316 BC, Seleucus and Peithon joined Antigonus, who was following Eumenes to Susa. From Susa Antigonus went to Media, from where he could threaten the eastern provinces. He left Seleucus with a small number of troops to prevent Eumenes from reaching the Mediterranean. Sibyrtius, satrap of Arachosia, saw the situation as hopeless and returned to his own province. The armies of Eumenes and his allies were at breaking point. Antigonus and Eumenes had two encounters during 316 BC, in the battles of Paraitacene and Gabiene. Eumenes was defeated and executed. The events of the Second War of the Diadochi revealed Seleucus' ability to wait for the right moment. Blazing into battle was not his style.

=== Escape to Egypt ===
Antigonus spent the winter of 316 BC in Media, whose ruler was once again Peithon. Peithon's lust for power had grown, and he tried to get a portion of Antigonus' troops to revolt to his side. Antigonus, however, discovered the plot and executed Peithon. He then superseded Peucestas as satrap of Persia. In the summer of 315 BC Antigonus arrived in Babylon and was warmly welcomed by Seleucus. The relationship between the two soon turned cold, however. Seleucus punished one of Antigonus' officers without asking permission from Antigonus. Antigonus became angry and demanded that Seleucus give him the income from the province, which Seleucus refused to do. He was, however, afraid of Antigonus and fled to Egypt with 50 horsemen. It is told that Chaldean astrologers prophesied to Antigonus that Seleucus would become master of Asia and would kill Antigonus. After hearing this, Antigonus sent soldiers after Seleucus, who had however first escaped to Mesopotamia and then to Syria. Antigonus executed Blitor, the new satrap of Mesopotamia, for helping Seleucus. Modern scholars are skeptical of the prophecy story. It seems certain, however, that the Babylonian priesthood was against Seleucus.

== Admiral under Ptolemy (316–311 BC) ==
After arriving in Egypt, Seleucus sent his friends to Greece to inform his fellow Diadochi Cassander (ruler of Macedon and overlord of Greece) and Lysimachus (ruler of Thracia) about Antigonus. Antigonus was now the most powerful of the Diadochi, and the others would soon have to face him. Ptolemy, Lysimachus and Cassander formed a coalition against Antigonus. The allies sent a proposition to Antigonus in which they demanded shares of his accumulated treasure and of his territory, with Phoenica and Syria going to Ptolemy, Cappadocia and Lycia to Cassander, Hellespontine Phrygia to Lysimachus, and Babylonia to Seleucus. Antigonus refused, and in the spring of 314 BC, he marched against Ptolemy in Syria. Seleucus acted as an admiral to Ptolemy during the first phase of the war. Antigonus was besieging Tyre, when Seleucus sailed past him and went on to threaten the coast of Syria and Asia Minor. Antigonus allied with the island of Rhodes, which had a strategic location and a navy capable of preventing the allies from combining their forces. Because of the threat of Rhodes, Ptolemy gave Seleucus a hundred ships and sent him to the Aegean Sea. The fleet was too small to defeat Rhodes, but it was big enough to force Asander, the satrap of Caria, to ally with Ptolemy. To demonstrate his power, Seleucus also invaded the city of Erythrai. Polemaios, a nephew of Antigonus, attacked Asander. Seleucus returned to Cyprus, where Ptolemy I had sent his brother Menelaos along with 10,000 mercenaries and 100 ships. Seleucus and Menelaos began to besiege Kition. Antigonus sent most of his fleet to the Aegean Sea and his army to Asia Minor. Ptolemy now had an opportunity to invade Syria, where he defeated Demetrius, the son of Antigonus, in the battle of Gaza in 312 BC. It is probable that Seleucus took part in the battle. Peithon, son of Agenor, whom Antigonus had nominated as the new satrap of Babylon, fell in the battle. The death of Peithon gave Seleucus an opportunity to return to Babylon.

Seleucus had prepared his return to Babylon well. After the battle of Gaza Demetrius retreated to Tripoli while Ptolemy advanced all the way to Sidon. Ptolemy gave Seleucus 800 infantry and 200 cavalry. He also had his friends accompanying him, perhaps the same 50 who escaped with him from Babylon. On the way to Babylon Seleucus recruited more soldiers from the colonies along the route. He finally had about 3,000 soldiers. In Babylon, Peithon's commander, Diphilus, barricaded himself in the city's fortress. Seleucus conquered Babylon with great speed and the fortress was also quickly captured. Seleucus' friends who had stayed in Babylon were released from captivity. His return to Babylon was afterwards officially regarded as the beginning of the Seleucid Empire and that year as the first of the Seleucid era.

== Satrap of Babylonia (311–306 BC) ==
=== Conquest of the eastern provinces ===
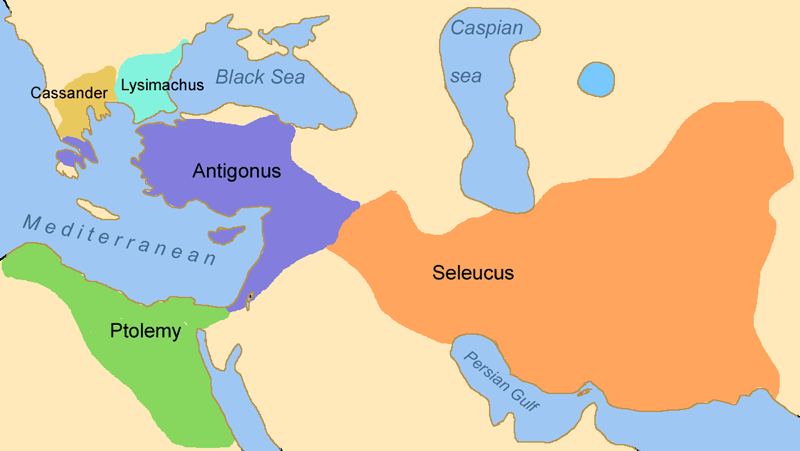
The kingdoms of Seleucus I, Antigonus, Ptolemy I, Cassander and Lysimachus

Soon after Seleucus' return, the supporters of Antigonus tried to get Babylon back. Nicanor was the new satrap of Media and the strategos of the eastern provinces. His army had about 17,000 soldiers. Evagoras, the satrap of Aria, was allied with him. It was obvious that Seleucus' small force could not defeat the two in battle. Seleucus hid his armies in the marshes that surrounded the area where Nicanor was planning to cross the Tigris and made a surprise attack during the night. Evagoras fell in the beginning of the battle and Nicanor was cut off from his forces. The news about the death of Evagoras spread among the soldiers, who started to surrender en masse. Almost all of them agreed to fight under Seleucus. Nicanor escaped with only a few men.

Even though Seleucus now had about 20,000 soldiers, they were not enough to withstand the forces of Antigonus. He also did not know when Antigonus would begin his counterattack. On the other hand, he knew that at least two eastern provinces did not have a satrap. A great majority of his own troops were from these provinces. Some of Evagoras' troops were Persian. Perhaps a portion of the troops were Eumenes' soldiers, who had a reason to hate Antigonus. Seleucus decided to take advantage of this situation.

Seleucus spread different stories among the provinces and the soldiers. According to one of them, he had in a dream seen Alexander standing beside him. Eumenes had tried to use a similar propaganda trick. Antigonus, who had been in Asia Minor while Seleucus had been in the east with Alexander, could not use Alexander in his own propaganda. Seleucus, being Macedonian, had the ability to gain the trust of the Macedonians among his troops, which was not the case with Eumenes.

After becoming once again satrap of Babylon, Seleucus became much more aggressive in his politics. In a short time he conquered Media and Susiana. Diodorus Siculus reports that Seleucus also conquered other nearby areas, which might refer to Persis, Aria or Parthia. Seleucus did not reach Bactria and Sogdiana. The satrap of the former was Stasanor, who had remained neutral during the conflicts. After the defeat of Nicanor's army, there was no force in the east that could have opposed Seleucus. It is uncertain how Seleucus arranged the administration of the provinces he had conquered. Most satraps had died. In theory, Polyperchon was still the lawful successor of Antipater and the official regent of the Macedonian kingdom. It was his duty to select the satraps. However, Polyperchon was still allied with Antigonus and thus an enemy of Seleucus.

=== Response ===
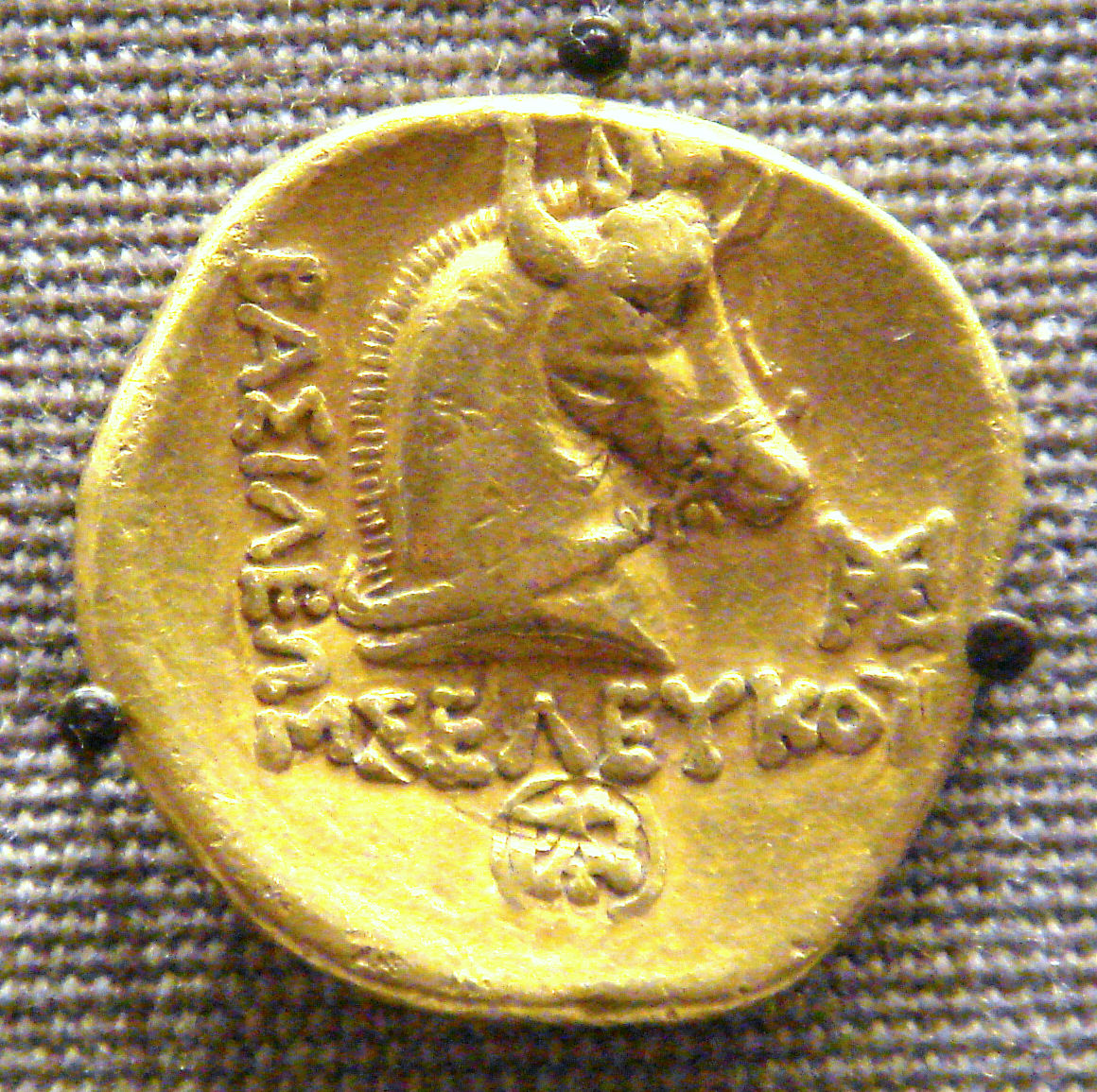
Seleucus I coin depicting Alexander the Great's horse Bucephalus.

Antigonus sent his son Demetrius along with 15,000 infantry and 4,000 cavalry to reconquer Babylon. Apparently, he gave Demetrius a time limit, after which he had to return to Syria. Antigonus believed Seleucus was still ruling only Babylon. Perhaps Nicanor had not told him that Seleucus now had at least 20,000 soldiers. It seems that the scale of Nicanor's defeat was not clear to all parties. Antigonus did not know Seleucus had conquered the majority of the eastern provinces and perhaps cared little about the eastern parts of the empire.

When Demetrius arrived in Babylon, Seleucus was somewhere in the east. He had left Patrocles to defend the city. Babylon was defended in an unusual way. It had two strong fortresses, in which Seleucus had left his garrisons. The inhabitants of the city were transferred out and settled in the neighbouring areas, some as far as Susa. The surroundings of Babylon were excellent for defence, with cities, swamps, canals and rivers. Demetrius' troops started to besiege the fortresses of Babylon and conquered one of them. The second fortress proved more difficult for Demetrius. He left his friend Archelaus to continue the siege, and himself returned west leaving 5,000 infantry and 1,000 cavalry in Babylon. Ancient sources do not mention what happened to these troops. Perhaps Seleucus had to reconquer Babylon from Archelaus.

=== Babylonian War ===
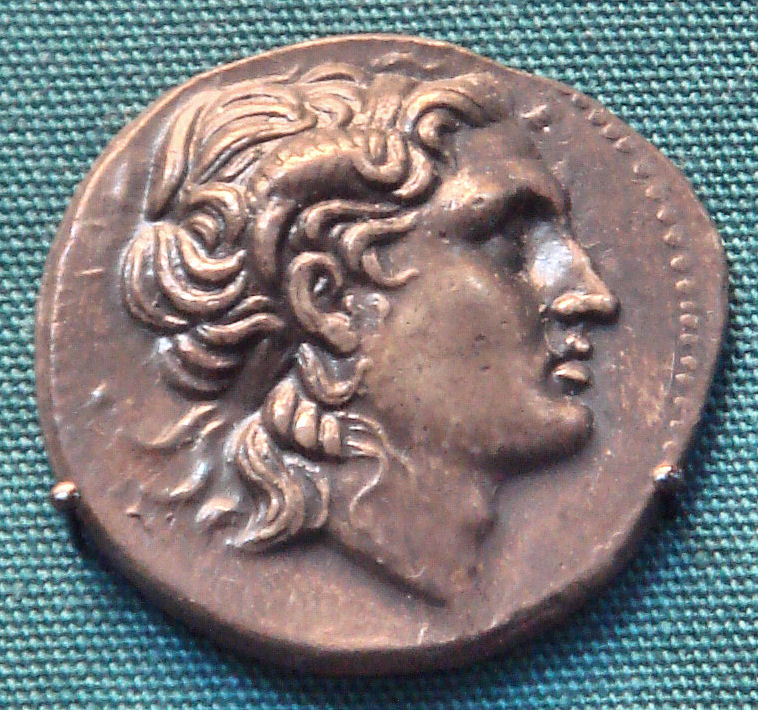
Coin of Lysimachus with an image of a horned Alexander the Great

Over the course of nine years (311–302 BC), while Antigonus was occupied in the west, Seleucus brought the whole eastern part of Alexander's empire as far as the Jaxartes and Indus Rivers under his authority.

In 311 BC Antigonus made peace with Cassander, Lysimachus and Ptolemy, which gave him an opportunity to deal with Seleucus. Antigonus' army had at least 80,000 soldiers. Even if he left half of his troops in the west, he would still have a numerical advantage over Seleucus. Seleucus may have received help from Cossaians, whose ancestors were the ancient Kassites. Antigonus had devastated their lands while fighting Eumenes. Seleucus perhaps recruited a portion of Archelaus' troops. When Antigonus finally invaded Babylon, Seleucus' army was much bigger than before. Many of his soldiers certainly hated Antigonus. The population of Babylon was also hostile. Seleucus, thus, did not need to garrison the area to keep the locals from revolting.

Little information is available about the conflict between Antigonus and Seleucus; only a very rudimentary Babylonian chronicle detailing the events of the war remains. The description of the year 310 BC has completely disappeared. It seems that Antigonus conquered Babylon. His plans were disturbed, however, by Ptolemy, who made a surprise attack in Cilicia.

We do know that Seleucus defeated Antigonus in at least one decisive battle. This battle is only mentioned in Stratagems in War by Polyaenus. Polyaenus reports that the troops of Seleucus and Antigonus fought for a whole day, but when night came the battle was still undecided. The two forces agreed to rest for the night and continue in the morning. Antigonus' troops slept without their equipment. Seleucus ordered his forces to sleep and eat breakfast in battle formation. Shortly before dawn, Seleucus' troops attacked the forces of Antigonus, who were still without their weapons and in disarray and thus easily defeated. The historical accuracy of the story is questionable.

The Babylonian war finally ended in Seleucus' victory. Antigonus was forced to retreat west. Both sides fortified their borders. Antigonus built a series of fortresses along the Balikh River while Seleucus built a few cities, including Dura-Europos and Nisibis.

=== Seleucia ===
The next event connected to Seleucus was the founding of the city of Seleucia. The city was built on the shore of the Tigris probably in 307 or 305 BC. Seleucus made Seleucia his new capital, thus imitating Lysimachus, Cassander and Antigonus, all of whom had named cities after themselves. Seleucus also transferred the mint of Babylon to his new city. Babylon was soon left in the shadow of Seleucia, and the story goes that Antiochus, the son of Seleucus, moved the whole population of Babylon to his father's namesake capital in 275 BC. The city flourished until AD 165, when the Romans destroyed it.

A story of the founding of the city goes as follows: Seleucus asked the Babylonian priests which day would be best to found the city. The priest calculated the day, but, wanting the founding to fail, told Seleucus a different date. The plot failed however, because when the correct day came, Seleucus' soldiers spontaneously started building the city. When questioned, the priests admitted their deed.

== King of the Seleucid empire (306–281 BC) ==
The struggle among the Diadochi reached its climax when Antigonus, after the extinction of the old royal line of Macedonia, proclaimed himself king in 306 BC. Ptolemy, Lysimachus, Cassander and Seleucus, the other four principal Macedonian chiefs, soon followed and assumed the title and style of basileus (king).

=== Chandragupta and the Eastern Provinces ===
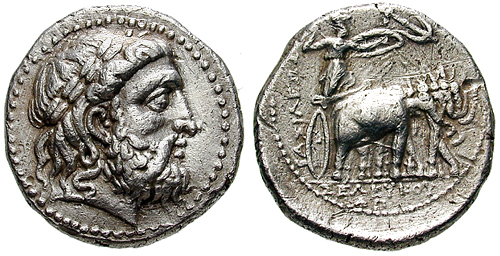
Tetradrachm of Seleucus I from the Seleucia mint. Obverse shows the head of Zeus. Reverse shows Athena with elephants, with Greek legend: ΒΑΣΙΛΕΩΣ ΣEΛEYKOY, Basileōs Seleukou, "of king Seleucus".

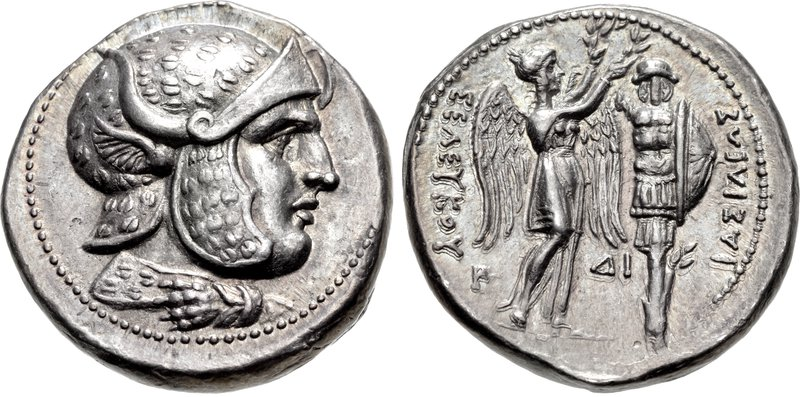
Coin of Seleucus I from the Susa mint. Obverse shows Seleucus wearing helmet covered with leopard skin and bull's horn and ear. Reverse shows Nike, holding in both hands a wreath that she places on trophy. Greek legend reads: ΒΑΣΙΛΕΩΣ ΣEΛEYKOY, Basileōs Seleukou, "of king Seleucus".

Seleucus soon turned his attention once again eastward. The Persian provinces in what is now modern Afghanistan, together with the wealthy kingdom of Gandhara and the states of the Indus Valley, had all submitted to Alexander the Great and become part of his empire. When Alexander died, the Wars of the Diadochi ("Successors") split his empire apart; as his generals fought for control of Alexander's empire. In the eastern territories, Seleucus I Nicator took control of Alexander's conquests. According to the Roman historian Appian:

[Seleucus was] always lying in wait for the neighboring nations, strong in arms and persuasive in council, he acquired Mesopotamia, Armenia, 'Seleucid' Cappadocia, Persis, Parthia, Bactria, Arabia, Tapouria, Sogdia, Arachosia, Hyrcania, and other adjacent peoples that had been subdued by Alexander, as far as the river Indus, so that the boundaries of his empire were the most extensive in Asia after that of Alexander. The whole region from Phrygia to the Indus was subject to Seleucus.

— Appian, History of Rome, The Syrian Wars 55

The Mauryans then annexed the areas around the Indus governed by the four Greek satraps: Nicanor, Phillip, Eudemus and Peithon. This established Mauryan control to the banks of the Indus. Chandragupta's victories convinced Seleucus that he needed to secure his eastern flank. Seeking to hold the Macedonian territories there, Seleucus thus came into conflict with the emerging and expanding Mauryan Empire over the Indus Valley.

In the year 306 BC, Seleucus I Nicator went to India and apparently occupied territory as far as the Indus, and eventually waged war with the Maurya Emperor Chandragupta Maurya. Only a few sources mention his activities in India. Chandragupta (known in Greek sources as Sandrokottos), founder of the Mauryan Empire, had conquered the Indus valley and several other parts of the easternmost regions of Alexander's empire. Seleucus began a campaign against Chandragupta and crossed the Indus. While the Greek sources have been interpreted by some as a Mauryan victory, (Note: Military historian John D. Grainger concludes that Seleucus invaded India, and was defeated, but states that "[b]eyond that, it is not possible to go without further evidence." There is "little or no evidence" for the idea that Chandragupta drove back Seleucus' forces as far back as Bactria. Other authors are equally cautious. Basham states that Seleucus "seems to have suffered the worst of the engagement." Romila Thapar speaks of "a campaign against Seleucus, in which Chandragupta seems to have been successful, judging by the terms of the treaty of 303 BC." Kulke and Rothermund state that Chandragupta "stopped his march east," and then present the terms of the peace treaty. Keay states that "perhaps he was roundly defeated. The terms of the peace treaty certainly suggest so.") the details of the conflict, and if there was in fact a pitched battle, are unknown, and Jansani warns that "there are very little details about the battle or skirmish they fought, and that none of the ancient authors depicted either Seleucus or Chandragupta as the clear victor of this battle. This lack of information about the encounter and the ensuing treaty means that it is impossible to reconstruct them." Wheatley and Heckel suggest that the degree of friendly Maurya-Seleucid relations established after the war implies that the hostilities were probably "neither prolonged nor grievous".

The two leaders ultimately reached an agreement, and through a treaty sealed in 303 BC, Seleucus abandoned the territories he could never securely hold in exchange for stabilizing the East and obtaining elephants, with which he could turn his attention against his great western rival, Antigonus Monophthalmus. The 500 war elephants Seleucus obtained from Chandragupta were to play a key role in the forthcoming battles, particularly at Ipsus against Antigonus and Demetrius. The Maurya king might have married the daughter of Seleucus. According to Strabo, the ceded territories bordered the Indus:

The geographical position of the tribes is as follows: along the Indus are the Paropamisadae, above whom lies the Paropamisus mountain: then, towards the south, the Arachoti: then next, towards the south, the Gedroseni, with the other tribes that occupy the seaboard; and the Indus lies, latitudinally, alongside all these places; and of these places, in part, some that lie along the Indus are held by Indians, although they formerly belonged to the Persians. Alexander [III 'the Great' of Macedon] took these away from the Arians and established settlements of his own, but Seleucus Nicator gave them to Sandrocottus [Chandragupta], upon terms of intermarriage and of receiving in exchange five hundred elephants. — Strabo 15.2.9

From this, it seems that Seleucus surrendered the easternmost parts of the provinces of Arachosia, Gedrosia, Paropamisadae and perhaps also Aria. On the other hand, he was accepted by other satraps of the eastern provinces. His Persian wife, Apama, may have helped him implement his rule in Bactria and Sogdiana. This would tend to be corroborated archaeologically, as concrete indications of Mauryan influence, such as the inscriptions of the Edicts of Ashoka which are known to be located in, for example, Kandhahar in today's southern Afghanistan.

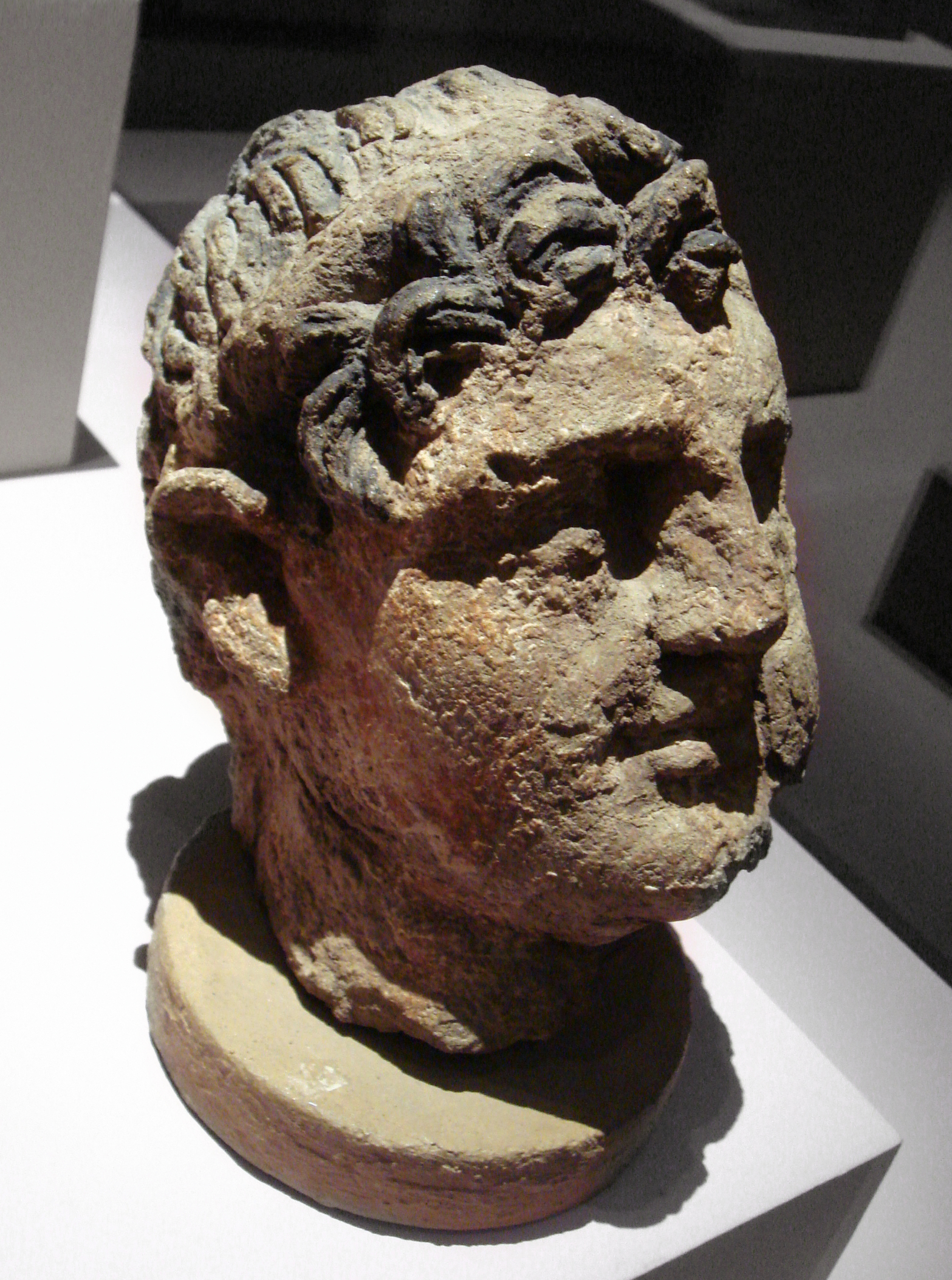
Portrait of Seleucus I or possibly a Greco-Bactrian ruler, with royal diadem. Temple of the Oxus, Takht-i Sangin, 3rd–2nd century BC, Tajikistan.

Some authors say that the argument relating to Seleucus handing over more of what is now southern Afghanistan is an exaggeration originating in a statement by Pliny the Elder referring not specifically to the lands received by Chandragupta, but rather to the various opinions of geographers regarding the definition of the word "India":

Most geographers, in fact, do not look upon India as bounded by the river Indus, but add to it the four satrapies of the Gedrose, the Arachotë, the Aria, and the Paropamisadë, the River Cophes thus forming the extreme boundary of India. According to other writers, however, all these territories, are reckoned as belonging to the country of the Aria. — Pliny, Natural History VI, 23

The span of control of the Mauryas is also questioned by present-day archaeologists, and the idea that the ceded territory included all of Aria and Gedrosia (Balochistan) seems unlikely. (Note: Kosmin: Kosmin (2014), The Land of the Elephant Kings: Space, Territory, and Ideology in Seleucid Empire, p.33: "Seleucus transferred to Chandragupta's kingdom the easternmost satrapies of his empire, certainly Gandhara, Parapamisadae, and the eastern parts of Gedrosia, and possibly also Arachosia and Aria as far as Herat." The acquisition of Aria (modern Herat) is disputed. According to Raychaudhuri & Mukherjee (1996), p.594, it "has been wrongly included in the list of ceded satrapies by some scholars [...] on the basis of wrong assessments of the passage of Strabo [...] and a statement by Pliny." According to John D Grainger (2014, p. 109), "Seleucus "must [...] have held Aria", and furthermore, his "son Antiochos was active there fifteen years later".)

The alliance between Chandragupta and Seleucus was affirmed with a marriage (Epigamia). Chandragupta or his son may have married a daughter of Seleucus, or perhaps there was diplomatic recognition of intermarriage between Indians and Greeks. An Indian Puranic source, the Pratisarga Parva of the Bhavishya Purana, described the marriage of Chandragupta with a Greek ("Yavana") princess, daughter of Seleucus (Suluva in Indian sources).

In addition to this matrimonial recognition or alliance, Seleucus dispatched an ambassador, Megasthenes, to the Mauryan court at Pataliputra (Modern Patna in Bihar state). Only short extracts remain of Megasthenes' description of the journey.

The two rulers seem to have been on very good terms, as classical sources have recorded that following their treaty, Chandragupta sent various presents such as aphrodisiacs to Seleucus. (Note: Athenaeus of Naucratis, The Deipnosophists: "And Theophrastus says that some contrivances are of wondrous efficacy in such matters [as to make people more amorous]. And Phylarchus confirms him, by reference to some of the presents which Sandrakottus, the king of the Indians, sent to Seleucus; which were to act like charms in producing a wonderful degree of affection, while some, on the contrary, were to banish love.")

Seleucus obtained knowledge of most of northern India, as explained by Pliny the Elder through his numerous embassies to the Mauryan Empire:

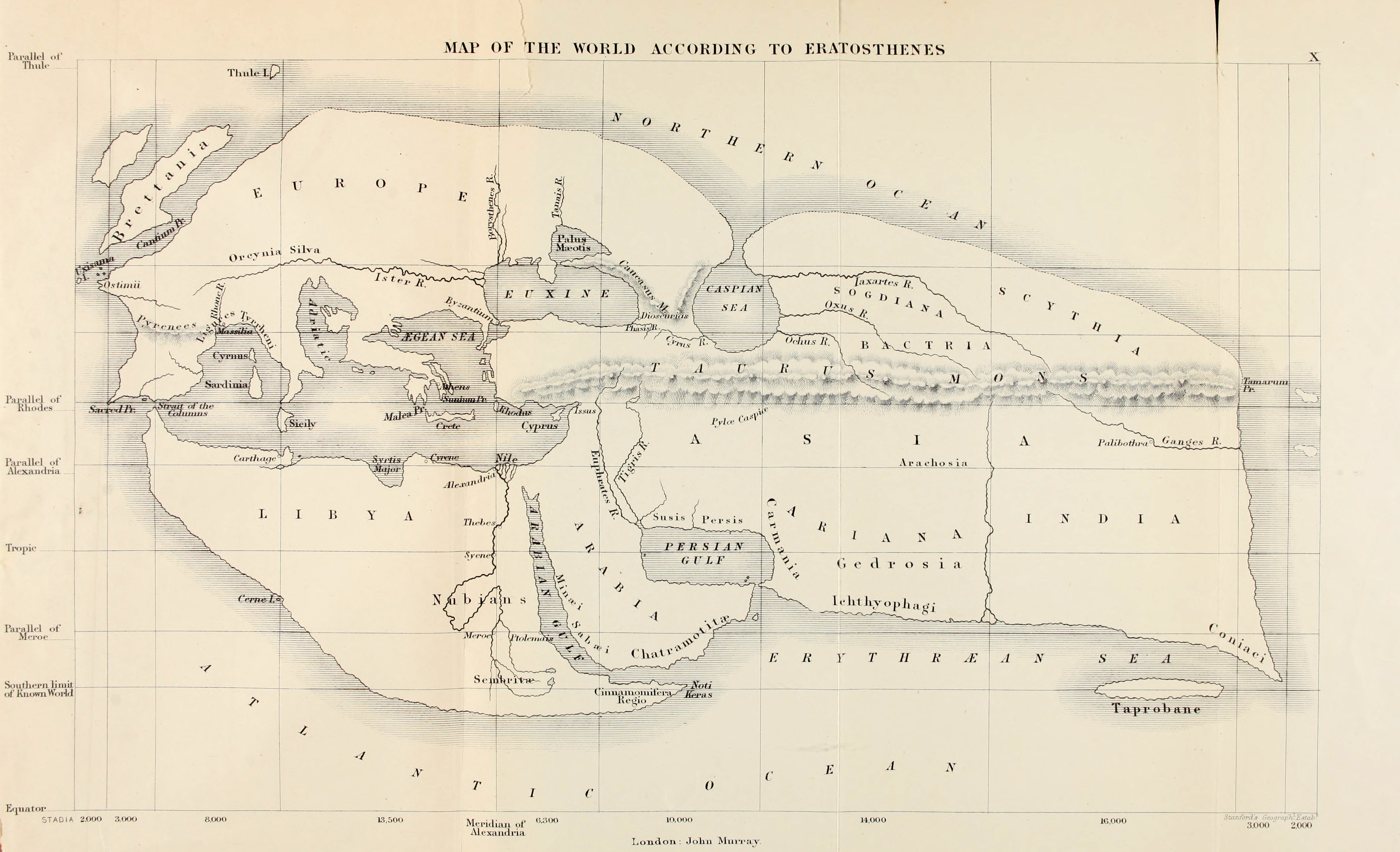
The Hellenistic world view after Seleucus: ancient world map of Eratosthenes (276–194 BC), incorporating information from the campaigns of Alexander and his successors

The other parts of the country beyond the Hydaspes, the farthest extent of Alexander's conquests were discovered and surveyed by Seleucus Nicator: namely

- from thence (the Hydaspes) to the Hesudrus 168 miles
- to the river Ioames (Yamuna) as much: and some copies add 5 miles more therto
- from thence to Ganges 112 miles
- to Rhodapha 119, and some say, that between them two it is no less than 325 miles.
- From it to Calinipaxa, a great town 167 miles-and-a-half, others say 265.
- And to the confluent of the rivers Iomanes and Ganges, where both meet together, 225 miles, and many put thereto 13 miles more
- from thence to the town Palibotta 425 miles
- and so to the mouth of the Ganges where he falleth into the sea 638 miles. — Pliny the Elder, Natural history, Book 6, Chap 21

Seleucus apparently minted coins during his stay in India, as several coins in his name are in the Indian standard and have been excavated in India. These coins describe him as "Basileus" ("King"), which implies a date later than 306 BC. Some of them also mention Seleucus in association with his son Antiochus as king, which would also imply a date as late as 293 BC. No Seleucid coins were struck in India thereafter and confirm the reversal of territory west of the Indus to Chandragupta. Seleucus may have founded a navy in the Persian Gulf and in the Indian Ocean.

=== Battle of Ipsus ===
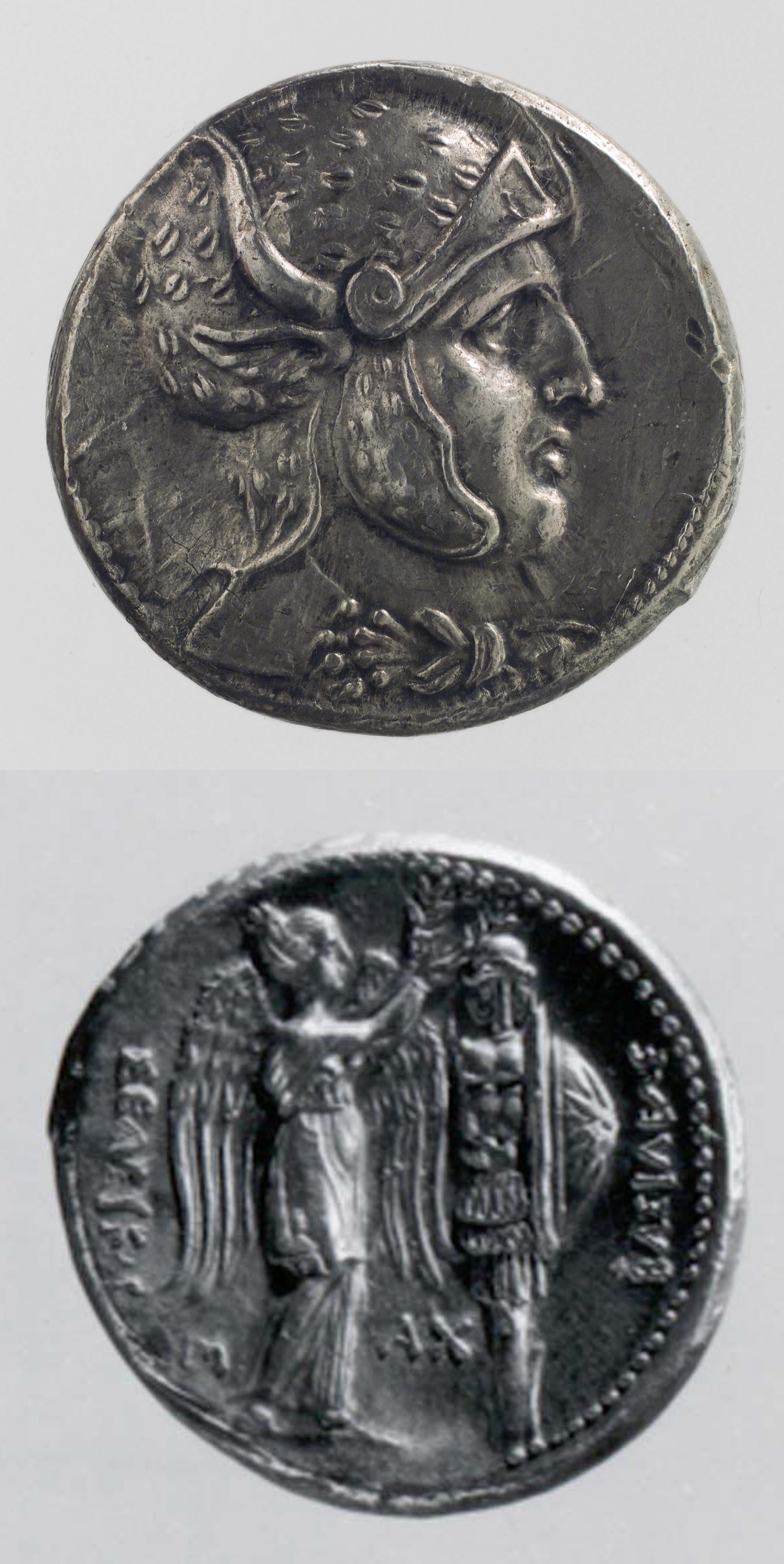
Tetradrachm of Seleucus I, minted at Susa. Obv: Portrait of male figure (probably Seleucus, but possibly Alexander or Dionysus), wearing a leopard-skin helmet, with a bull's ear and horns. Rev: Nike, holding a wreath over a trophy, probably referring to the Battle of Ipsus. Legend "King Seleucus".

The war elephants Seleucus received from Chandragupta proved to be useful when the Diadochi finally decided to deal with Antigonus. Cassander, Seleucus and Lysimachus defeated Antigonus and Demetrius in the battle of Ipsus. Antigonus fell in battle, but Demetrius escaped. After the battle, Syria was placed under Seleucus' rule. He understood Syria to encompass the region from the Taurus Mountains to Sinai, but Ptolemy had already conquered Palestine and Phoenicia. In 299 BC, Seleucus allied with Demetrius and married his daughter Stratonice. Stratonice was also the daughter of Antipater's daughter Phila. Seleucus had a daughter by Stratonice, who was also called Phila. The fleet of Demetrius destroyed Ptolemy's fleet and thus Seleucus did not need to fight him.

Seleucus, however, did not manage to enlarge his kingdom to the west. The main reason was that he did not have enough Greek troops. During the battle of Ipsus, he had less infantry than Lysimachus. His strength was in his war elephants and in traditional Persian cavalry. In order to enlarge his army, Seleucus tried to attract colonists from mainland Greece by founding four new cities—Seleucia Pieria and Laodicea in Syria on the coast and Antioch on the Orontes and Apameia in the Orontes River valley. Antioch became his chief seat of government. The new Seleucia was supposed to become his new naval base and a gateway to the Mediterranean. Seleucus also founded six smaller cities. It is said of Seleucus that "few princes have ever lived with so great a passion for the building of cities. He is reputed to have built in all nine Seleucias, sixteen Antiochs, and six Laodiceas".

=== Defeat of Demetrius and Lysimachus ===
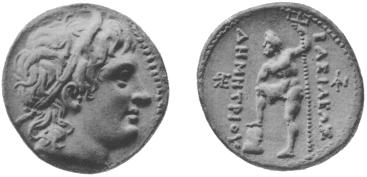
Silver coin of Demetrius I Poliorcetes, with the Greek legend: ΒΑΣΙΛΕΩΣ ΔΗΜΗΤΡΙΟΥ, Basileōs Dēmētriou, "of king Demetrius".

Seleucus nominated his son Antiochus I as his co-ruler and viceroy of the eastern provinces in 292 BC, the vast extent of the empire seeming to require a double government. In 294 BC Stratonice married her stepson Antiochus. Seleucus reportedly instigated the marriage after discovering that his son was in danger of dying of love sickness. Seleucus was thus able to get Stratonice out of the way, as her father Demetrius had now become king of Macedonia.

The alliance between Seleucus and Demetrius ended in 294 BC when Seleucus conquered Cilicia. Demetrius invaded and easily conquered Cilicia in 286 BC, which meant that Demetrius was now threatening the most important regions of Seleucus' empire in Syria. Demetrius' troops, however, were tired and had not received their payment. Seleucus, on the other hand, was known as a cunning and rich leader who had earned the adoration of his soldiers. Seleucus blocked the roads leading south from Cilicia and urged Demetrius' troops to join his side. Simultaneously he tried to evade battle with Demetrius. Finally, Seleucus addressed Demetrius personally. He showed himself in front of the soldiers and removed his helmet, revealing his identity. Demetrius' troops now started to abandon their leader en masse. Demetrius was finally imprisoned in Apameia and died a few years later in captivity.

Lysimachus and Ptolemy had supported Seleucus against Demetrius, but after the latter's defeat the alliance started to break apart. Lysimachus ruled Macedonia, Thracia and Asia Minor. He also had problems with his family. Lysimachus executed his son Agathocles, whose wife Lysandra escaped to Babylon to Seleucus.

The unpopularity of Lysimachus after the murder of Agathocles gave Seleucus an opportunity to remove his last rival. His intervention in the west was solicited by Ptolemy Keraunos, who, on the accession to the Egyptian throne of his brother Ptolemy II (285 BC), had at first taken refuge with Lysimachus and then with Seleucus. Seleucus then invaded Asia Minor and defeated his rival in the Battle of Corupedium in Lydia, 281 BC. Lysimachus fell in battle. In addition, Ptolemy had died a few years earlier. Seleucus was thus now the only living contemporary of Alexander.

=== Administration of Asia Minor ===
Before his death, Seleucus tried to deal with the administration of Asia Minor. The region was ethnically diverse, consisting of Greek cities, a Persian aristocracy and indigenous peoples. Seleucus perhaps tried to defeat Cappadocia, but failed. Lysimachus' old officer Philetairos ruled Pergamon independently. On the other hand, based on their names, Seleucus apparently founded a number of new cities in Asia Minor.

Few of the letters Seleucus sent to different cities and temples still exist. All cities in Asia Minor sent embassies to their new ruler. It is reported that Seleucus complained about the number of letters he received and was forced to read. He was apparently a popular ruler. In Lemnos he was celebrated as a liberator and a temple was built to honour him. According to a local custom, Seleucus was always offered an extra cup of wine during dinner time. His title during this period was Seleucus Soter ("saviour"). When Seleucus left for Europe, the organizational rearrangement of Asia Minor had not been completed.

== Death and legacy ==
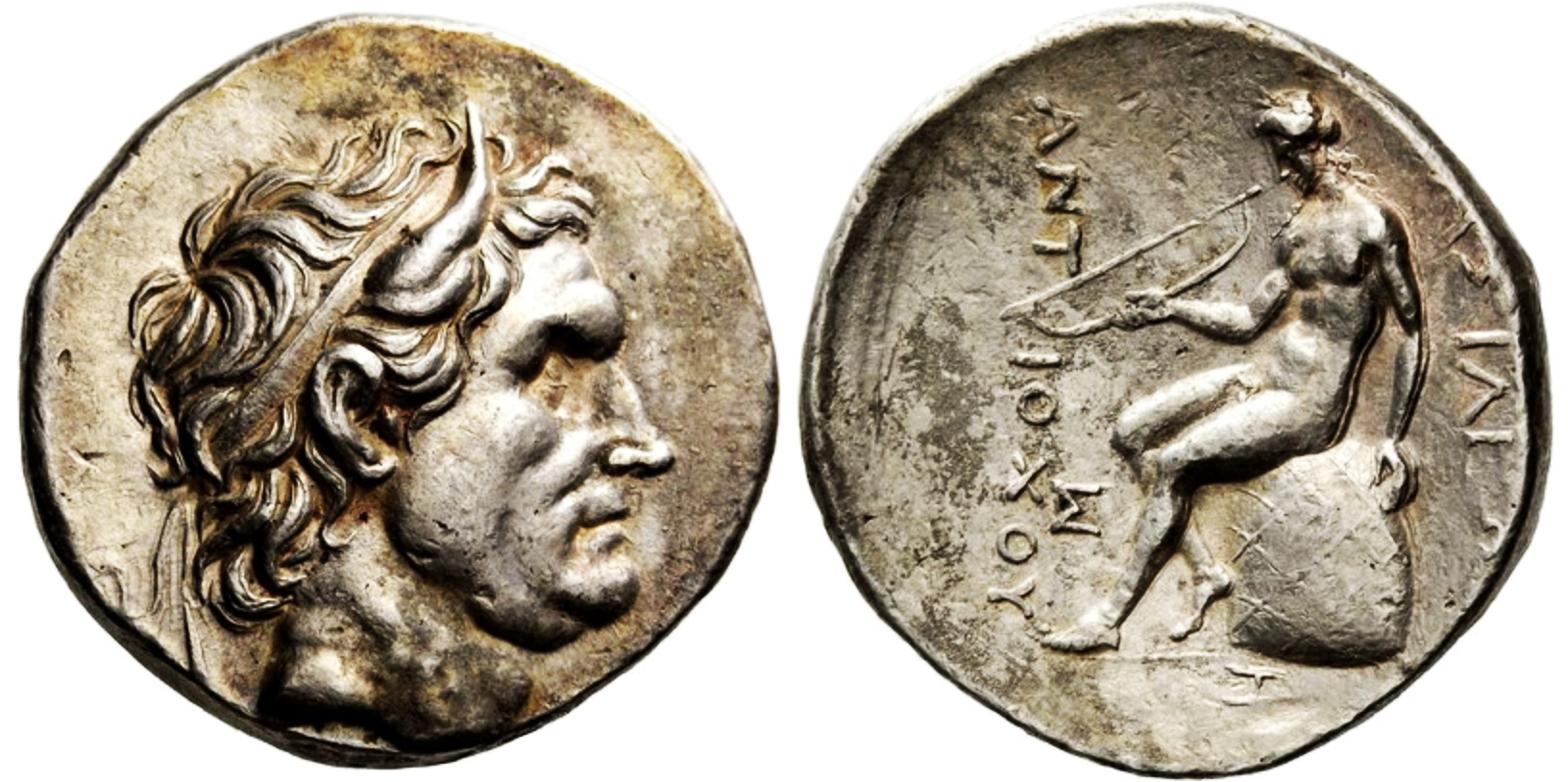
Tetradrachm of Antiochus I. Obverse shows the bust of Seleucus I, with bull's horns. The reverse shows Apollo seated on omphalos, holding bow. Greek legend reads: BAΣIΛEΩΣ ANTIOXOY, Basileōs Antiochou, "of king Antiochus".

Seleucus now held the whole of Alexander's conquests except Egypt and moved to take possession of Macedonia and Thrace. He intended to leave Asia to Antiochus and content himself for the remainder of his days with the Macedonian kingdom in its old limits. He had, however, hardly crossed into the Thracian Chersonese when he was assassinated by Ptolemy Ceraunus near Lysimachia in September 281 BC.

It appears certain that after taking Macedonia and Thracia, Seleucus would have tried to conquer Greece. He had already prepared this campaign using the numerous gifts presented to him. He was also nominated an honorary citizen of Athens. Antiochus founded the cult of his father. A cult of personality formed around the later members of the Seleucid dynasty and Seleucus was later worshipped as a son of Zeus Nikator. One inscription found in Ilium (Troy) advises priests to sacrifice to Apollo, the ancestor of Antiochus' family. Several anecdotes of Seleucus' life became popular in the classical world.

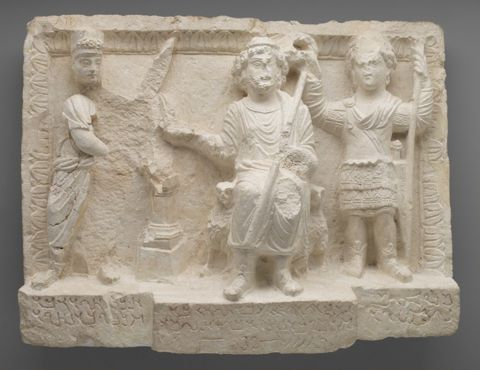
Cult relief showing Seleucus I Nicator on the right, crowning the Gad of Dura.

Seleucus’ reputation as a founder of cities also seems to have persisted after his death. Excavations at the site of Dura-Europos in Syria, for instance, uncovered a cult relief from a temple showing Seleucus, as the founder of the city, crowning the Gad of Dura. Clearer evidence that the city considered Seleucus to be its founder come from a fragmentary papyrus document, P. Dura 32, which designates Dura-Europos as "the colony of the Europeans of Seleucs Nicator". The sparse archaeological remains from the Hellenistic period of the site, however, indicate that the site began life as a small garrison settlement (a phourion) on royal land that did not yet have the status of a polis. The road system and fortifications only seem to have been constructed in 150 CE. The small community, living around the base of the citadel, with small plots of land for each soldier in the surrounding countryside, is unlikely to have had much royal attention in this early period, but the legend surrounding Seleucus I Nicator as a city founder seems to have led later inhabitants to attach his name to their settlement.

== See also ==
- Chronology of European exploration of Asia

== Sources ==
- Boiy, T. (2004). Late Achaemenid and Hellenistic Babylon. Peeters Publishers. ISBN 978-90-429-1449-0.
- Bosworth, A. B. (2005). The Legacy of Alexander. Oxford University Press. ISBN 978-0-19-928515-0.
- Grainger, John D. (1990). Seleukos Nikator: Constructing a Hellenistic Kingdom. Routledge. ISBN 978-0-415-04701-2.
- Grainger, John D. (1997). Seleukos Nikator: Constructing a Hellenistic Kingdom. Routledge. ISBN 0-415-04701-3.
- Grainger, John D. (2014), Seleukos Nikator: Constructing a Hellenistic Kingdom, Routledge, ISBN 978-1-317-80099-6
- Jansari, Sushma (2023). Chandragupta Maurya: The creation of a national hero in India. UCL Press.
- Keay, John (2018) [2000]. India: A History. Harper Perennial. p. 84. ISBN 978-0006387848.
- Kosmin, Paul J. (2014), The Land of the Elephant Kings: Space, Territory, and Ideology in Seleucid Empire, Harvard University Press, ISBN 978-0-674-72882-0
- Kulke, Hermann; Rothermund, Dietmar (2016). A History of India (6th ed.). Routledge. ISBN 978-1138961159.
- Majumdar, Ramesh Chandra (2003) [1952]. Ancient India. Motilal Banarsidass. ISBN 978-81-208-0436-4.
- Mookerji, Radha Kumud (1988) [first published in 1966]. Chandragupta Maurya and his times (4th ed.). Motilal Banarsidass. ISBN 978-81-208-0433-3.
- Ogden, Daniel (2017). The Legend of Seleucus: Kingship, Narrative and Mythmaking in the Ancient World. Cambridge University Press. ISBN 978-1-107-16478-9.
- Wheatley, Pat; Heckel, Waldemar (2011), ""Commentary (Book 15)"", Justin: Epitome of the Philippic History of Pompeius Trogus: Volume II, Oxford University Press, ISBN 978-0-19-927759-9

Seleucus I Nicator Seleucid dynasty Born: c. 358 BC Died: September 281 BC
Regnal titles
Preceded by New creation Independence from Macedon under Alexander IV	Seleucid King; 305 – September 281 BC	Succeeded by Antiochus I Soter
