= Ptolemy (son of Seleucus) =

General under Alexander the Great

Ptolemy (Greek: Πτολεμαῖος; died 333 BC) was the son of Seleucus, of a noble family of Orestis or Tymphaia, a Somatophylakes and a Taxiarch commanding of one of the divisions of the phalanx during the Persian campaigns of Alexander the Great.

== Biography ==
In 334 BC he was selected by the king to command the body of Macedonians who were allowed to return home for the winter on the account that he was newly wed. In the following spring he rejoined Alexander at Gordium, with the troops under his command, accompanied by fresh reinforcements. At the Battle of Issus (333 BC) his division of the phalanx was one of those opposed to the Greek mercenaries under Darius III, and upon which the real brunt of the action consequently devolved; and he himself fell in the conflict, after displaying the utmost valour.
