= List of state leaders in the 3rd century =

This is a list of state leaders in the 3rd century (201–300) AD.

== Africa ==
=== Africa: East ===
- Kingdom of Aksum (complete list) –

- GDRT, King (c.200)
- `DBH, King (c.230–c.240)
- Sembrouthes, King (c.250)
- DTWNS, King (c.260)
- Endybis, King (c.270–c.300)

=== Africa: Northeast ===
- Kingdom of Kush (complete list) –

- Teritedakhatey, King (early 3rd century)
- Aryesbokhe, King (early 3rd century)
- Teqerideamani II, King (3rd century)
- Talakhidamani (c. 260 / c. 300)

- Maleqorobar, Prince (3rd century)

- Yesbokheamani, King (c. 300)

== Americas ==
=== Americas: Mesoamerica ===
Maya civilization

- Tikal (complete list) –

- Foliated Jaguar, Ajaw (2nd–3rd century)
- Animal Headdress, Ajaw (c.292)

== Asia ==
=== Asia: Central ===
Mongolia

- Xianbei state –

- Budugen, Chieftain (187–234)

=== Asia: East ===
China

- Eastern Han, China (complete list) –

- Xian, Emperor (189–220)

- Cao Wei (complete list) –

- Cao Pi, Emperor (220–226)
- Cao Rui, Emperor (227–239)
- Cao Fang, Emperor (240–249)
- Cao Mao, Emperor (254–260)
- Cao Huan, Emperor (260–265)

- Shu Han (complete list) –

- Liu Bei, Emperor (221–223)
- Liu Shan, Emperor (223–263)

- Eastern Wu (complete list) –

- Sun Quan, Emperor (222–252)
- Sun Liang, Emperor (252–258)
- Sun Xiu, Emperor (258–264)
- Sun Hao, Emperor (264–280)

- Western Jin, China (complete list) –

- Wu, Emperor (266–290)
- Hui, Emperor (290–307)

Japan

- Japan, Yayoi period (complete list) –

Previous emperors are considered legendary.
- Ōjin, Emperor (270–310)

- Yamatai –

- Himiko, Queen (189-248)
- Iyo, Queen (248–?)

Korea

- Baekje (complete list) –

- Chogo, King (166–214)
- Gusu, King (214–234)
- Saban, King (234)
- Goi, King (234–286)
- Chaekgye, King (286–298)
- Bunseo, King (298–304)

- Geumgwan Gaya (complete list) –

- Geodeung, King (199–259)
- Mapum, King (259–291)
- Geojilmi, King (291–346)

- Goguryeo (complete list) –

- Sansang, King (197–227)
- Dongcheon, King (227–248)
- Jungcheon, King (248–270)
- Seocheon, King (270–292)
- Bongsang, King (292–300)
- Micheon, King (300–331)

- Silla (complete list) –

- Naehae, King (196–230)
- Jobun, King (230–247)
- Cheomhae, King (247–261)
- Michu, King (262–284)
- Yurye, King (284–298)
- Girim, King (298–310)

=== Asia: Southeast ===
Cambodia

- Funan –

- Fàn Shīmàn, King (early 3rd century)
- Fàn Jīnshēng, King (c.230)
- Fàn Zhān, King (c.230–c.243 or later)
- Fàn Cháng, King (after 243)
- Fàn Xún, King (c.250-287)

Indonesia: Java

- Salakanagara –

- Dewawarman III, King (2nd–3rd century)
- Dewawarman IV, King (early 3rd century)
- Dewawarman V, King (mid 3rd century)
- Dewawarman VI, King (late 3rd century)

Vietnam

- Champa (complete list) –

- Khu Liên, King (192–mid 3rd century)
- Fan Hsiung, King (c.270–280)
- Fan Yi, King (c.284–336)

=== Asia: South ===
India

- Chera dynasty (complete list) –

- Cenkuttuvan, King (c.188–244)

- Gupta Empire (complete list) –

- Śri Gupta, Emperor (c.240–c.280)
- Ghatotkacha, Emperor (c.280–c.319)

- Kushan Empire (complete list) –

- Vasudeva I, Ruler/Emperor (c.190–230s)
- Kanishka II, Ruler/Emperor (c.230–240)
- Vashishka, Ruler/Emperor (c.240–250)
- Kanishka III, Ruler/Emperor (c.250–275)
- Vasudeva II, Ruler/Emperor (c.275–310)

- Satavahana dynasty (Purana-based chronology) –

- Sri Yajna Satakarni, King (172–201)
- Vijaya Satakarni, King (201–207)
- Chandra Sri Satakarni, King (207–214)
- Pulumavi IV, King (217–224)

- Western Satraps (complete list) –

- Rudrasena I, Satrap (200–222)
- Prthivisena, Satrap (222)
- Samghadaman, Satrap (222–223)
- Damasena, Satrap (223–232)
- Damajadasri II, Satrap (232–239)
- Viradaman, Satrap (234–238)
- Isvaradatta, Satrap (236–239)
- Yasodaman I, Satrap (239)
- Vijayasena, Satrap (239–250)
- Damajadasri III, Satrap (251–255)
- Rudrasena II, Satrap (255–277)
- Visvasimha, Satrap (277–282)
- Bhartrdaman, Satrap (282–295)
- Visvasena, Satrap (293–304)

- Vakataka dynasty (complete list) –

- Vindhyashakti, King (250–270)
- Pravarasena I, King (270–330)

Pakistan

- Indo-Parthian Kingdom (complete list) –

- Farn-Sasan, King (210–226)

- Kushano-Sasanian Kingdom (complete list) –

- Ardashir I, Kushanshah (230–245)
- Peroz I, Kushanshah (245–275)
- Hormizd I, Kushanshah (275–300)
- Hormizd II, Kushanshah (300–303)

- Paratarajas (complete list) –

- Kozana, Raja (c.200–220)
- Bhimarjuna, Raja (c.220–235)
- Koziya, Raja (c.235–265)
- Datarvharna, Raja (c.265–280)
- Datayola II, Raja (c.280–300)

Sri Lanka

- Anuradhapura Kingdom (complete list) –

- Siri Naga I, King (196–215)
- Voharika Tissa, King (215–237)
- Abhaya Naga, King (237–245)
- Siri Naga II, King (245–247)
- Vijaya Kumara, King (247–248)
- Sangha Tissa I, King (248–252)
- Siri Sangha Bodhi I, King (252–254)
- Gothabhaya, King (254–267)
- Jettha Tissa I, King (267–277)
- Mahasena, King (277–304)

=== Asia: West ===
- Osroene (complete list) –

- Abgar IX, client King under Rome (177–212)
- Abgar X Severus bar Ma'nu, client King under Rome (212–214)
- Abgar (X) Severus Bar Abgar (IX) Rabo, client King under Rome (214–216)
- Ma’nu (IX) Bar Abgar (X) Severus, client King under Rome (216–242)
- Abgar (XI) Farhat Bar Ma’nu (IX), client King under Rome (242–244)

- Palmyra –

- Odaenathus (bef. 258–267)
- Zenobia Regent (267–272)
- Vaballathus King (267–272)

- Roman Empire: East –

- Diocletian, Eastern Augustus (284–305)
- Galerius, Eastern Caesar (293–311)

Persia

- Persia: Sasanian Empire (complete list) –

- Vologases V, Great King, Shah (191–208)
- Vologases VI, Great King, Shah – in civil war (208–228)
- Artabanus V, Great King, Shah – in civil war (208–224)

- Adiabene (complete list) –

- Shahrat (Shahrad), client King under Parthia (c.213–224)

- Characene (complete list) –

- Maga, client King under Parthia (c.195–210)
- Abinergaos III, client King under Parthia (c.210–222)

- Elymais (complete list) –

- Unknown client King under Parthia (c.190–c.210)
- Unknown client King under Parthia (c.210–c.220)
- Orodes VI client King under Parthia (c.220–224)

- Persia: Sasanian Empire (complete list) –

- Ardashir I, Shahanshah, King of Kings (224–242)
- Shapur I, Shahanshah, King of Kings (240–270)
- Hormizd I, Shahanshah, King of Kings (270–271)
- Bahram I, Shahanshah, King of Kings (271–274)
- Bahram II, Shahanshah, King of Kings (274–293)
- Bahram III, Shahanshah, King of Kings (293)
- Narseh, Shahanshah, King of Kings (293–302)
- Shapur IV,§ Shahanshah, King of Kings (420)
- Khosrau the Usurper,§ Shahanshah, King of Kings (420)
- Bahram V, Shahanshah, King of Kings (420–438)
- Yazdegerd II, Shahanshah, King of Kings (438–457)
- Hormizd III, Shahanshah, King of Kings (457–459)
- Peroz I, Shahanshah, King of Kings (459–484)
- Balash, Shahanshah, King of Kings (484–488)
- Kavadh I, Shahanshah, King of Kings (488–496)
- Djamasp, Shahanshah, King of Kings (496–498)
- Kavadh I, Shahanshah, King of Kings (498–531)
- Khosrow I, Shahanshah, King of Kings (531–579)
- Hormizd IV, Shahanshah, King of Kings (579–590)
- Khosrow II, Shahanshah, King of Kings (590)
- Bahram VI Chobin,§ Shahanshah, King of Kings (590–591)
- Khosrow II, Shahanshah, King of Kings (591–628)
- Vistahm,§ Shahanshah, King of Kings (591–596)
- Kavadh II, Shahanshah, King of Kings (628)
- Ardashir III, Shahanshah, King of Kings (628–629)
- Shahrbaraz,§ Shahanshah, King of Kings (629)
- Khosrow III,§ Shahanshah, King of Kings (629)
- Borandukht, Shahanshah, King of Kings (629–630)
- Shapur-i Shahrvaraz,§ Shahanshah, King of Kings (630)
- Peroz II,§ Shahanshah, King of Kings (630)
- Azarmidokht, Shahanshah, King of Kings (630–631)
- Farrukh Hormizd,§ Shahanshah, King of Kings (630–631)
- Hormizd VI,§ Shahanshah, King of Kings (630–631)
- Khosrow IV,§ Shahanshah, King of Kings (631)
- Farrukhzad Khosrau V,§ Shahanshah, King of Kings (631)
- Boran, Shahanshah, King of Kings (631–632)
- Yazdegerd III, Shahanshah, King of Kings (632–651)

== Europe ==
=== Europe: Central ===
- Gallic Empire (complete list) –

- Postumus, Emperor (260–268)
- Laelianus, Emperor, usurper (268)
- Marius, Emperor (268)
- Victorinus, Emperor (268–270)
- Domitian II, Emperor, usurper (c.271)
- Tetricus the elder, Emperor (270–274)
- Tetricus the younger, Caesar (270–274)
- Faustinus, Emperor, usurper (273–274)

- Alamannia, tribal kingdoms (complete list) –

- Chrocus, leader (fl.260–306)

=== Europe: East ===
- Bosporan Kingdom (complete list) –

- Sauromates II, client king under Rome (172–210)
- Rhescuporis III, client king under Rome (211–228)
- Cotys III, client king under Rome (228–234)
- Sauromates III, client king under Rome (229–232)
- Rhescuporis IV, client king under Rome (233–234)
- Ininthimeus, client king under Rome (234–239)
- Rhescuporis V, client king under Rome (240–276)
- Pharsanzes, client king under Rome (253–254)
- Teiranes, client king under Rome (276–278)
- Sauromates IV, client king under Rome (276)
- Theothorses, client king under Rome (279–309)

=== Europe: Southcentral ===
Roman Empire

- Roman Empire (complete list) –

- Septimius Severus, Emperor (193–211)
- Caracalla, Emperor (198–217)
- Geta, Emperor (209–211)
- Macrinus, Emperor (217–218)
- Diadumenian, Emperor (217–218)
- Elagabalus, Emperor (218–222)
- Severus Alexander, Emperor (222–235)
- Maximinus I, Emperor (235–238)
- Gordian I, Emperor (238–238)
- Gordian II, Emperor (238–238)
- Pupienus, Emperor (238–238)
- Balbinus, Emperor (238–238)
- Gordian III, Emperor (238–244)
- Philip the Arab, Emperor (244–249)
- Philip II, Emperor (247–249)
- Decius, Emperor (249–251)
- Herennius Etruscus, Emperor (251)
- Hostilian, Emperor (251)
- Trebonianus Gallus, Emperor (251–253)
- Volusianus, Emperor (251–253)
- Aemilianus, Emperor (253)
- Valerian, Emperor (253–260)
- Gallienus, Emperor (253–268)
- Saloninus, Emperor (260)
- Claudius Gothicus, Emperor (268–270)
- Quintillus, Emperor (270)
- Aurelian, Emperor (270–275)
- Tacitus, Emperor (275–276)
- Florian, Emperor (276)
- Probus, Emperor (276–282)
- Carus, Emperor (282–283)
- Numerian

- Caesar (282–283)
- Co-Emperor (283–284)

- Carinus

- Caesar (282–283)
- Co-Emperor (283–284)
- Emperor in civil war (284–285)

- Diocletian

- Emperor in civil war (284–285)
- Sole Emperor (285–286)
- Eastern Emperor (286–305)

- Maximian

- Caesar (285–286)
- Western Emperor (286–305)

- See also: List of Roman consuls

- Roman Empire: West –

- Maximian, Western Augustus (286–305)
- Constantius Chlorus, Western Caesar (293–306)

=== Eurasia: Caucasus ===
- Armenia: Arsacid dynasty (complete list) –

- Khosrov I, client King under Rome (198–217)
- Tiridates II, client King under Rome (217–252)
- Khosrov II, client King under Rome (c.252)
- Interregnum under Sasania
- Artavasdes IV, client King under Sasania (252–287)
- Tiridates III, client King under Rome (287–330)

- Kingdom of Iberia (Kartli) (complete list) –

- Rev I, King (189–216)
- Vache, King (216–234)
- Bacurius I, King (234–249)
- Mihrdat II, King (249–265)
- Aspacures I, King (265–284)
- Mirian III, King (284–361)

== See also ==
- List of political entities in the 3rd century
