= Crimea in the Roman era =

Roman Crimea (47 BC to c. 340 AD)

The Crimean Peninsula (at the time known as Taurica) was under partial control of the Roman Empire during 47 BC to c. 340 AD and the 6th to 13th century. The territory under Roman control mostly coincided with the Bosporan Kingdom (although under Nero, from 62 to 68 AD, it was briefly attached to the Roman Province of Moesia Inferior). Rome lost its influence in Taurica in the mid third century AD, when substantial parts of the peninsula fell to the Goths, but at least nominally the kingdom survived until the 340s AD. The Eastern Roman Empire, that survived the loss of the western parts of its empire, later regained Crimea under Justinian I and controlled portions of the peninsula well into the Late Middle Ages, particularly through the successor states of the Empire of Trebizond and the Principality of Theodoro.

== Roman Empire ==
Rome started to dominate the Crimea peninsula (then called Taurica) in the 1st century BC. The initial area of their penetration was mainly in eastern Crimea (Bosporus kingdom) and in the western Greek city of Chersonesos. The interior was only nominally under Roman rule.

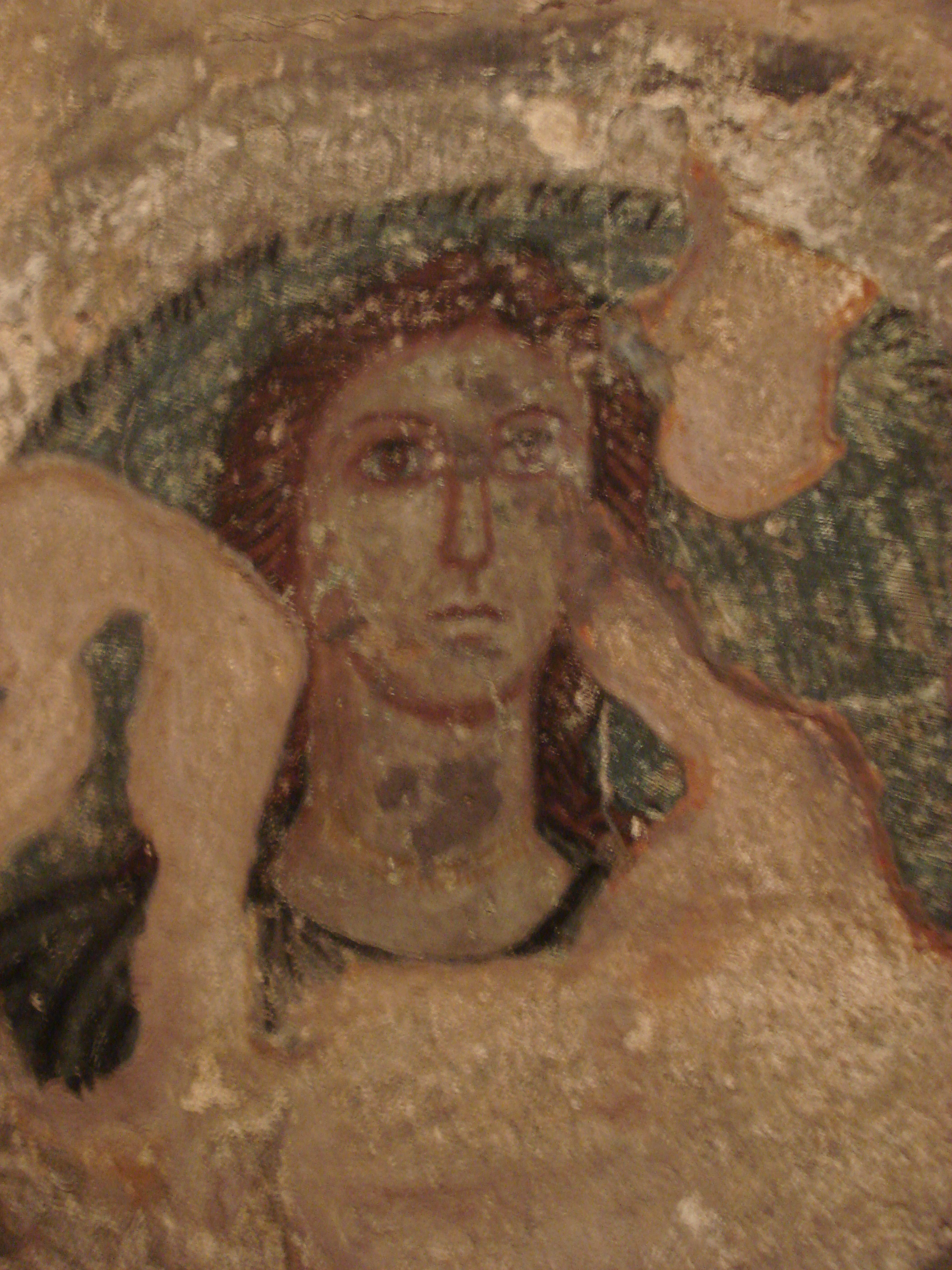
A Greek fresco depicting the goddess Demeter, from Panticapaeum in the ancient Bosporan Kingdom (a client state of the Roman Empire), 1st century AD, Crimea.

In ancient times Crimea was known as "Chersonesus Taurica", from the name of the Tauri, who were descendants of the Cimmerians. Many Greek colonists settled in Taurica: their most renowned colony was Chersonesos. In 114 BC the Bosporus kingdom accepted the overlordship of Mithridates VI Eupator, king of Pontus, as a protection from tribes of Scythians. For nearly five centuries after the defeat of Mithridates by the Roman Pompey, Crimea was under the suzerainty of Rome.

The main Roman settlement was Charax, a castrum probably built around 60–65, and the main naval Roman base was in Chersonesos.

When the Romans arrived at Taurica, they set up their camp and built a fortress and a temple of Jupiter Dolichenus on the coast of the harbor of Balaklava, then called Symbolon Limen.

Tiberius Julius Aspurgus (8 BC – 38) founded a line of Bosporan Kings which endured with some interruptions until 341. Originally called Aspurgus, he adopted the Roman names "Tiberius Julius" because he received Roman citizenship and enjoyed the patronage of the first two Roman Emperors, Augustus and Tiberius. All of the following kings adopted these two Roman names followed by a third name, mostly of Pontic, Thracian or Sarmatian origin. Bosporan kings struck coinage throughout the kingdom period, which included gold staters bearing portraits of the respective Roman Emperors.

In 67, Emperor Nero prepared a military expedition to conquer for Rome all the northern shores of the Black Sea from the Caucasus to what is now Romania-Moldova-Ukraine, but his death stopped the project. For this reason, he probably put Taurica under direct Roman rule and created the Charax castrum. He extended the Roman province of Lower Moesia to Tyras, Olbia and Taurica (the peninsula of Crimea).

Taurica enjoyed a relative golden period under Roman leadership during the 2nd century AD, with huge commerce of wheat, clothing, wine and slaves of the Black Sea slave trade:

The prosperous merchant-towns (of Taurica), permanently in need of military protection amidst a flux of barbaric peoples, held to Rome as the advanced posts to the main army....(during that century) Roman troops were stationed in the peninsula, perhaps a division of the Pontic fleet, certainly a detachment of the Moesian army, (other garrisons in Panticapaeum and Chersonesos); their presence even in small numbers showed to the barbarians that the dreaded legionary stood behind (the Bosporanum Regnum).

The region was temporarily conquered by the Goths in 250. The last client king of the Roman Empire in Taurica was Tiberius Julius Rhescuporis VI, who died in 342. Rhescuporis seems to have minted coins as late as 341, indicating that there was some extent of political control over the remnants of the kingdom at this point. The remnants of the Bosporan kingdom were finally swept away with the invasion of the Huns in 375/6.

=== Charax ===
The largest Roman military settlement in Taurica was Charax. It was situated on a four-hectare area at the western ridge of "Ai Todor", close to the modern Yalta castle of Swallow's Nest.

When in 62–66 AD the Roman garrisons were installed in Taurica, Charax became one of their strongholds. The Romans built a fortress and stationed a sub-unit (vexillatio) of the "Ravenna squadron". Charax was a very important strategic point, because it allowed the Romans to establish control over the navigation along the Crimean coast.

The military camp was fully developed under Vespasian with the intention of protecting Chersonesos and other Bosporean trade emporiums from the Scythians. By the end of the 1st century, the Roman forces were evacuated from the Crimea peninsula.

Several decades later the camp was restored by a vexillatio of the Legio I Italica: it hosted a detachment of the Legio XI Claudia at the end of the 2nd century. In this century, new stone walls were added to the fortress and a new Roman road was built, connecting Charax to Chersonesos.

The camp was abandoned by the Romans at the end of the 3rd century.

=== Roman client kings ===
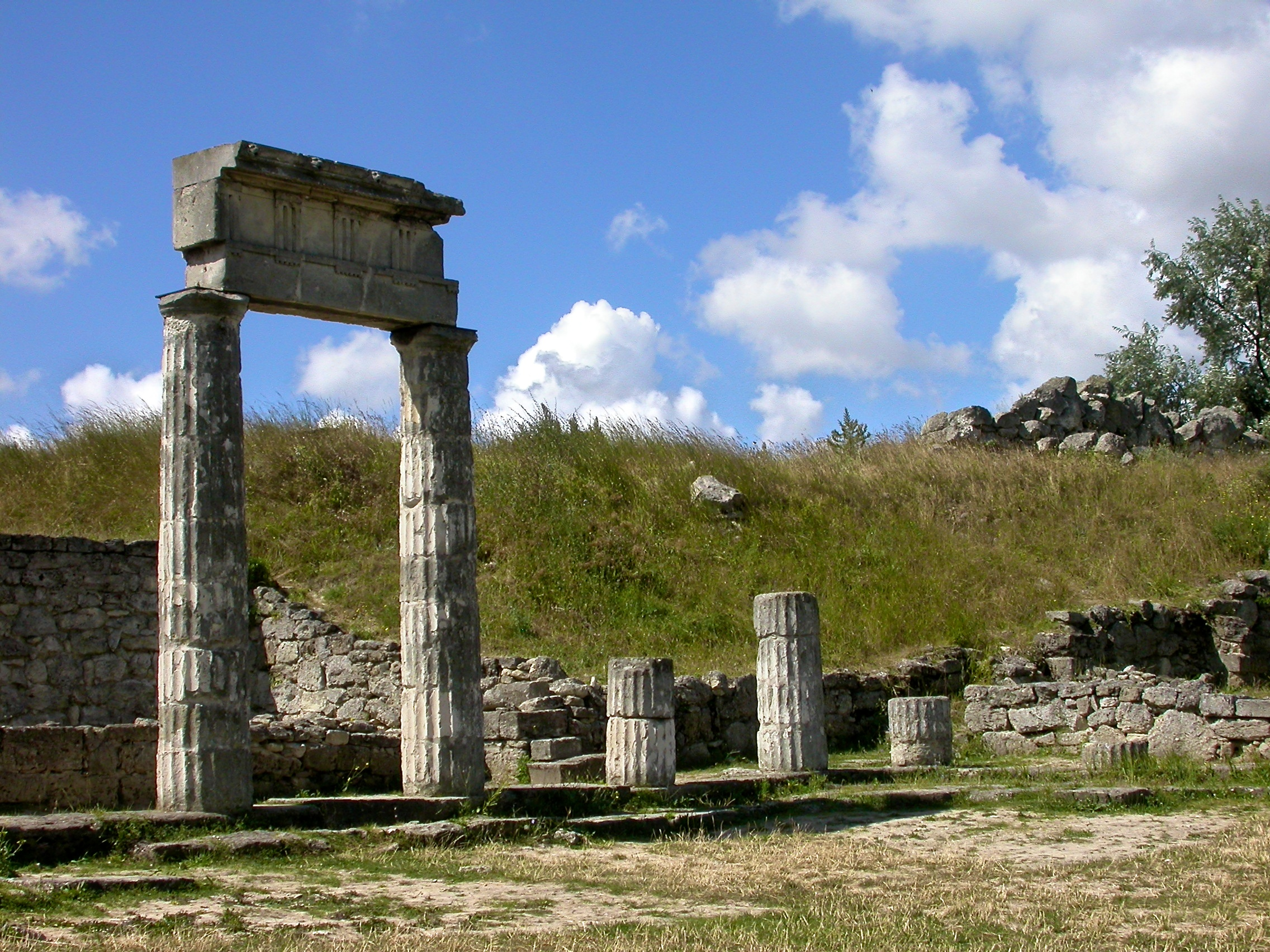
Ruins of Panticapaeum, main city of the Bosporan Kingdom during Roman times

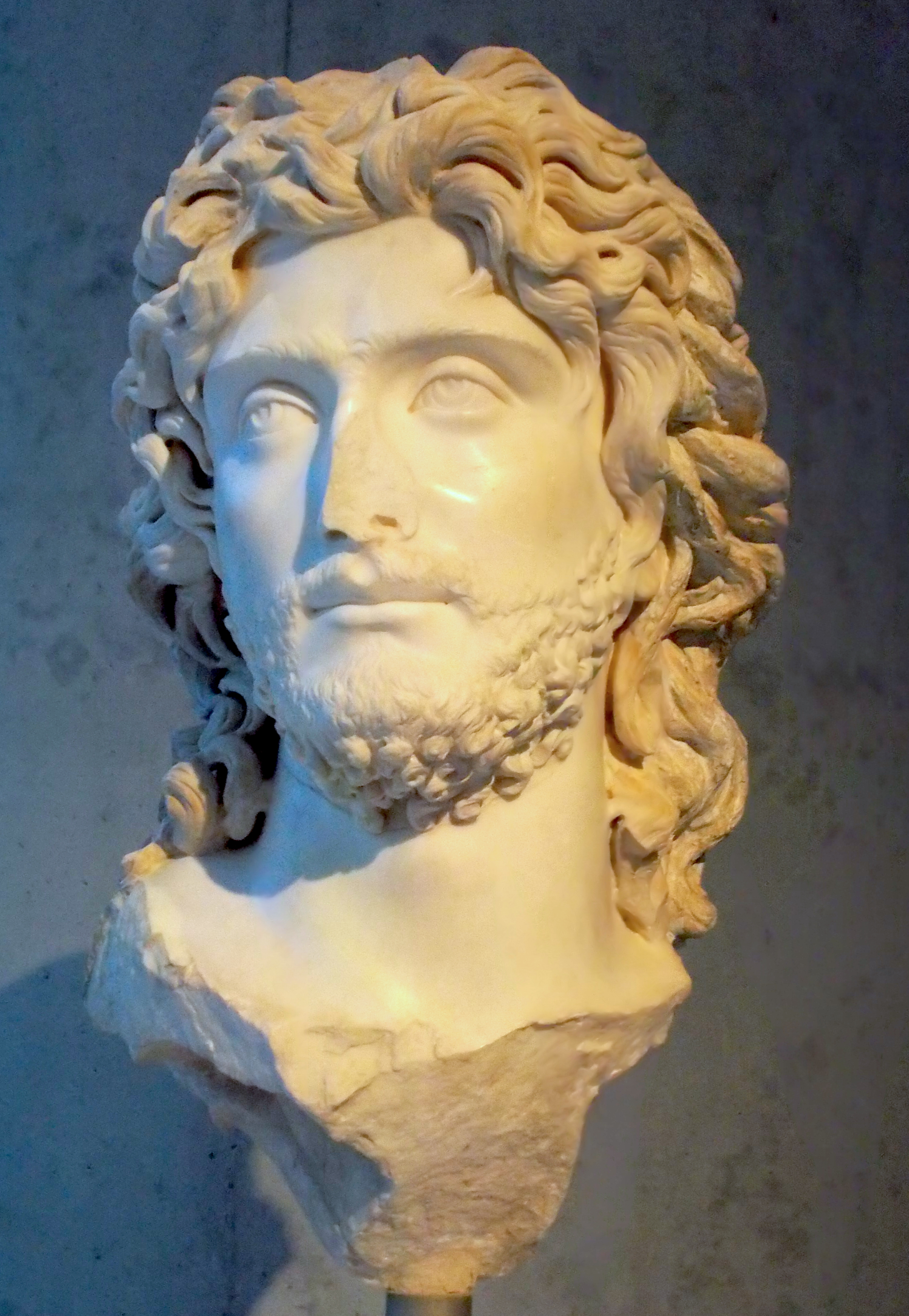
Bust of Tiberius Julius Sauromates II (d. 210 AD), from the Acropolis Museum

These are the Roman client kings of the Bosporan Kingdom:

- Pharnaces 64 BC – 47 BC
- Mithridates I 47 BC – 44 BC
- Asander 47 BC, then 44 BC – 17 BC
- Scribonius 17 BC – 16 BC
- Dynamis with Asander 47 BC, then 44 BC – 17 BC, then with Polemon from 16 BC until her death in 14 BC
- Polemon I 16 BC – 8 BC
- Aspurgus 8 BC – 38 AD
- Rhescuporis I 14 – 42 AD
- Polemon II 38 – 41 AD
- Mithridates II 42 – 46 AD
- Cotys I 46 – 78
  - Roman Province 63 – 68
- Rhescuporis II 78 – 93
- Sauromates I 93 – 123
- Cotys II 123 – 131
- Rhoemetalces 131 – 153
- Eupator 154 – 170
- Sauromates II 172 – 210
- Rhescuporis III 211 – 228
- Cotys III 228 – 234
- Sauromates III 229 – 232
- Rhescuporis IV 233 – 234
- Chedosbios 233 – 234 (?)
- Ininthimeus 234 – 239
- Rhescuporis V 240 – 276
- Pharsanzes 253 – 254
- Teiranes 276 – 278
- Sauromates IV 276
- Theothorses 279 – 309
- Rhadamsades 309 – 322
- Rhescuporis VI 314 – 341

=== Episcopal sees ===
Ancient episcopal sees of Roman Crimea (Zechia) that are listed in the Annuario Pontificio as titular sees include:

- Bosporus, Byzantine? Archbishopric
- Chersonesus in Zechia
- Matrega
- Nicopsis (Tuapse)
- Phulli (Stary Krym), ?Archbishopric
- Soldaia
- Sugdaea
- Tanais

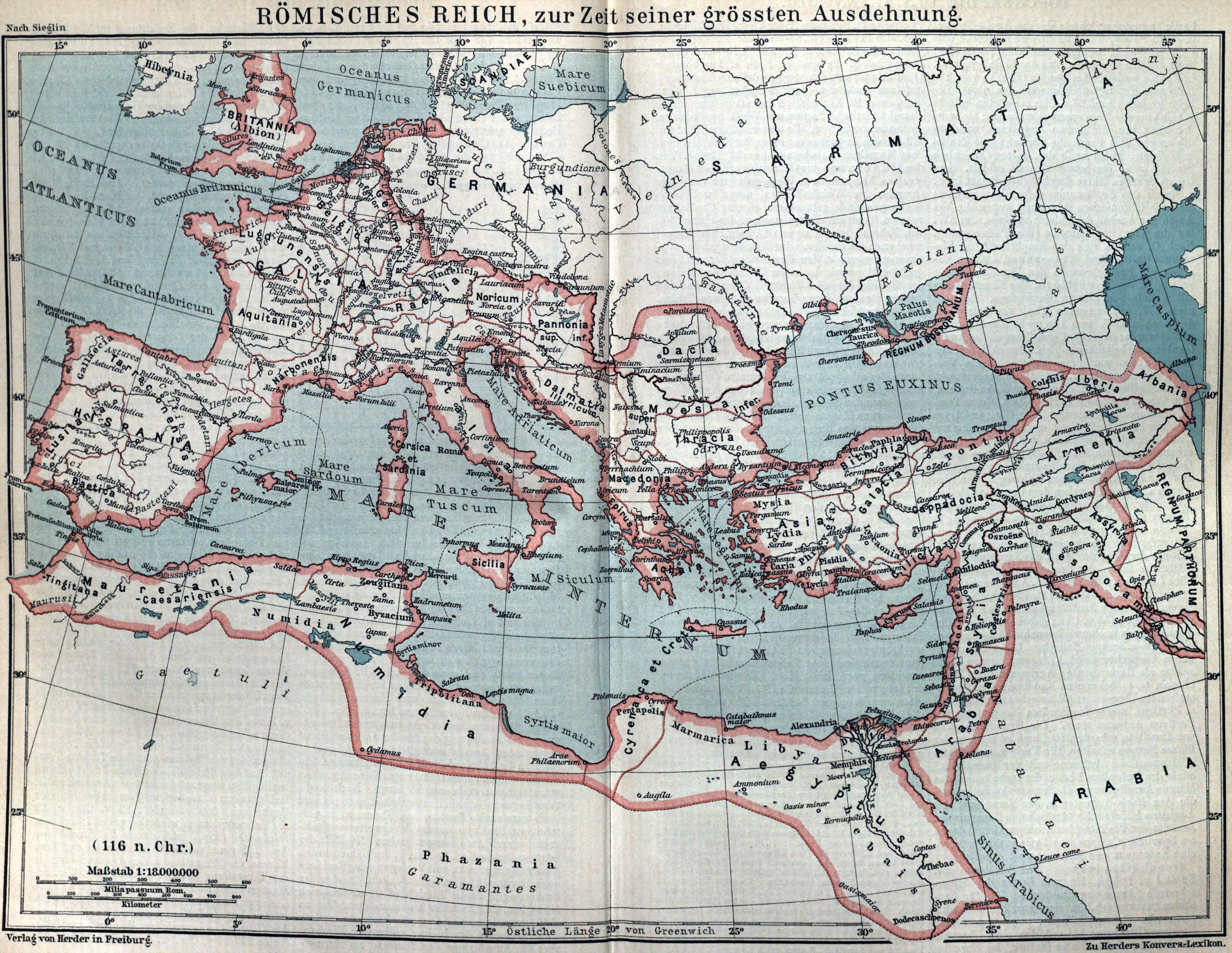
The "Regnum Bosporanum" during the conquests of the Emperor Trajan (r. 98–117)

== Byzantine Empire ==
The Byzantine Empire (Eastern Roman Empire) re-established Roman control of the region under Emperor Justinian I (r. 527–565).

In the 6th century, probably at the end of the reign of Justinian I, the status of Roman Crimea changed. Taurica became the Province of Chersonesos, which also included Bosporos and the southern coast of Crimea.

This enlargement of Byzantine Taurica resulted in the elevation of the ranks of its governors. In the second half of the 6th century, the military and civil authorities in the region were entrusted to the military deputy, "doux Chersonos".

Furthermore, the city of Chersonnesos was used by the Romans as a place of banishment: St. Clement of Rome died there in exile in 99 AD, having first preached the Gospel in the region. Another exile, the Emperor Justinian II, spent the years c. 695 to c. 703 there - after he returned to power (in 705) he allegedly destroyed the city in revenge.

Most of Roman Crimea fell under Khazar overlordship in the late 7th century.

In the mid-8th century, the Khazars put down the rebellious Crimean Goths and their city, Doros (modern Mangup), was occupied. A Khazar tudun (ruler) was resident at Chersonesos already in 690, despite the fact that this town was nominally subject to the Byzantine Empire. The Byzantine emperors controlled the southern shores of the Crimea peninsula (the theme of Cherson) until the 13th century. Control then passed to the Empire of Trebizond, one of the successor states to the Byzantine Empire after the sack of Constantinople in 1204. Another offshoot, the Crimea-based Principality of Theodoro, endured from the 14th century until 1475, when the Ottoman Empire conquered it.

Many series of Roman coins survive from the 1st century BC to about 300, and also some from the Byzantine period.

== See also ==
- History of Crimea
- Italians of Crimea
- Strait of Kerch
- List of Kings of Cimmerian Bosporus

== Bibliography ==
- Joseph Coleman Carter; Glenn Randall Mack, eds. (2003). Crimean Chersonesos: city, chora, museum, and environs. University of Texas at Austin. Institute of Classical Archaeology. ISBN 978-0-9708879-2-4.
- Fornasier, Jochen; Böttger, Burkhard (2002). Das Bosporanische Reich: der Nordosten des Schwarzen Meeres in der Antike (in German). ISBN 978-3-8053-2895-1.
- Theodor Mommsen; William Purdie Dickson (1996). The provinces of the Roman Empire, from Caesar to Diocletian. ISBN 978-0-7607-0145-4.
