= List of Roman client rulers =

This is a list of the client rulers of Ancient Rome, sectioned by the kingdom, giving the years the ruler was on the throne, and separating Kings and Queens.

Rome's foreign clients were called amici populi Romani (friends of the Roman people) and listed on the tabula amicorum (table of friends). They did not sign treaties or have formal obligations, but entered into alliance (societas) and friendship (amicitia) with Rome, generally in a dependent state.

== Client Kings ==
=== Pharos ===
- Demetrius of Pharos c.222- 219 BC.

=== Colchis/Lazica ===
- Aristarchus of Colchis 63-50 BC
- Malassas 2nd century AD
- Pacorus of the Lazi 2nd century AD

=== Cottian Kingdom ===
- Donnus 1st century BC
- Cottius 1st century BC
- Donnus II 3 BC-4 AD
- Cottius II 5-63 AD

=== Bosporan Kingdom ===
- Pharnaces 64-47 BC
- Mithridates II 47-44 BC
- Asander 47 BC, then 44-17 BC
- Scribonius 17-16 BC
- Dynamis with Asander 47 BC, then 44-17 BC, then with Polemon from 16 BC until her death in 14 BC
- Polemon I 16-8 BC
- Aspurgus 8 BC-38 AD
- Rhescuporis I 14-42 AD
- Polemon II 38-41 AD
- Mithridates III 42-45 AD
- Cotys I 45-63 AD
  - Roman Province 63-68
- Rhescuporis II 68-93 AD
- Sauromates I 93-123 AD
- Cotys II 123-131 AD
- Rhoemetalces 131-153 AD
- Eupator 154-170 AD
- Sauromates II 172-210 AD
- Rhescuporis III 211-228 AD
- Cotys III 228-234 AD
- Sauromates III 229-232 AD
- Rhescuporis IV 233-234 AD
- Chedosbios 233-234 AD (?)
- Ininthimeus 234-239 AD
- Rhescuporis V 240-276 AD
- Pharsanzes 253-254 AD
- Teiranes 276-278 AD
- Sauromates IV 276 AD
- Theothorses 279-309 AD
- Rhadamsades 309-322 AD
- Rhescuporis VI 314-341 AD

=== Kingdom of Thrace ===
- Cotys III and Rhescuporis II c. 12-18 AD
- Rhoemetalces II c. 19-36 AD
- Rhoemetalces III c. 38-46 AD

=== Kingdom of Pontus ===
- Pharnaces II of Pontus 63-47 BC
- Darius of Pontus 37 BC
- Arsaces of Pontus 37-36 BC
- Polemon I of Pontus 36-8 BC
- Polemon II of Pontus 38-62 AD

=== Kingdom of Emesa ===
- Sampsiceramus I 63-48 BC
- Iamblichus (phylarch) 48-31 BC
- Iamblichus II 20 BC-14 AD
- Sampsiceramus II 14-42 AD
- Gaius Julius Azizus 42-54 AD
- Sohaemus of Emesa 54-73 AD
- Gaius Julius Alexion 73-78 AD

=== Kingdom of Judea & Herodian tetrarchy ===
- Herod the Great 37-4 BC
- Herod Archelaus (in Judea) 4 BC-6 AD
- Philip the Tetrarch (in Batanea) 4 BC-34 AD
- Herod Antipas (in Galilee) 4 BC-39 AD
- Herod Agrippa 37-44AD
- Herod Agrippa II 53–100AD

=== Kingdom of Mauretania ===
- Juba II 25 BC - 23 AD
- Ptolemy of Mauretania 20-40 AD

=== Kingdom of Numidia ===
- Hiempsal II 88-60 BC
- Juba I 60-46 BC
- Juba II 30-25 BC

=== Kingdom of Chalcis ===
- Herod of Chalcis 41-48 AD
- Herod Agrippa II 48-53 AD
- Aristobulus of Chalcis 53-92 AD

=== Kingdom of Armenia ===
- Artaxias II 33-20 BC
- Tigranes III 20-10 BC
- Tigranes IV 10-5 BC
- Artavasdes III of Armenia 5-2 BC
- Ariobarzanes II of Atropatene 2 BC-4 AD
- Artavasdes IV of Armenia 4-6 AD
- Tigranes V of Armenia 6-12 AD
- Artaxias III 18-35 AD
- Arsaces I of Armenia 35 AD
- Orodes of Armenia 35 AD
- Mithridates of Armenia 35-37 AD
- Orodes of Armenia 37-42 AD
- Mithridates of Armenia 42-51 AD
- Tiridates I of Armenia 52-58 AD
- Tigranes VI of Armenia 58-61 AD
- Tiridates I of Armenia (second reign) 62-88 AD
- Sanatruk of Armenia 88-109 AD
- Axidares of Armenia 110-113 AD
- Parthamasiris of Armenia 113-114 AD
- Vologases I 117-144 AD
- Sohaemus of Armenia 144-161 AD
- Bakur 161-164 AD
- Sohaemus of Armenia 164-186 AD
- Khosrov I of Armenia 198-217 AD
- Tiridates II of Armenia 217-252 AD
- Khosrov III the Small 330-339 AD
- Tiran of Armenia 339-350 AD
- Arshak II 350-368 AD
- Pap of Armenia 370-374 AD
- Varazdat 374-378 AD
- Arshak III and Vologases of Armenia 378-386
- Arshak III 387 AD

=== Lesser Armenia ===
- Deiotarus 60-40 BC
- Artavasdes I of Media Atropatene 30-20 BC
- Cotys IX 38-48 AD
- Aristobulus of Chalcis 55-72 AD

=== Kingdom of Sophene ===
- Tigranes the Younger 65 BC
- Sohaemus of Emesa 54-73 AD

=== Kingdom of Gordyene ===
- Zarbienus 70-69 BC
- Manisarus ?-115 AD

=== Kingdom of Cilicia ===
- Tarcondimotus Philantonois 60s-31 BC
- Philopator I 31-30 BC
- Amyntas of the Tectosagii 30-25 BC
- Philopator II 20 BC-17 AD
- Archelaus of Cilicia 17-38 AD
- Antiochus IV of Commagene 38-58 AD
- Gaius Julius Alexander 58-72 AD

=== Kingdom of Commagene ===
- Antiochus I of Commagene 70-31 BC
- Mithridates II of Commagene 31-20 BC
- Mithridates III of Commagene 20-12 BC
- Antiochus III of Commagene 12 BC-17 AD
- Antiochus IV of Commagene 38-72 AD

=== Kingdom of Cappadocia ===
- Ariobarzanes III of Cappadocia 51-42 BC
- Ariarathes X of Cappadocia 42-36 BC
- Archelaus of Cappadocia 36 BC-17 AD

=== Ethnarchy of Comana ===
- Archelaus I 63-55 BC
- Archelaus II 55-47 BC
- Lycomedes of Comana 47-31 BC
- Medeius of Comana 31 BC
- Cleon of Gordiucome 31-30 BC
- Dyteutus 30 BC-34 AD

=== Seleucid Empire ===
- Philip II Philoromaeus 65-64 BC

=== Kingdom of Galatia ===
- Deiotarus 62-40 BC
- Brogitarus 58-50 BC
- Amyntas of Galatia 36-25 BC

=== Parthian Empire ===
- Parthamaspates of Parthia 116-117 AD

=== British Tribes ===
==== Atrebates/Regni ====
- Tincomarus 25 BC-7 AD
- Eppillus 7-15 AD
- Verica 15-42 AD
- Tiberius Claudius Cogidubnus 43-80 AD

==== Trinovantes ====
- Mandubracius 54 BC -?
- Addedomarus 25-10 BC
- Dubnovellaunus 10 BC-8 AD
- Cunobeline 9-35 AD

==== Iceni ====
- Prasutagus 43-60 AD

== Client Queens ==
This is a list of the client queens of ancient Rome, sectioned by the kingdom, and giving the years the queen was on the throne.

=== Bosporan Kingdom ===
- Gepaepyris
- Dynamis

=== Kingdom of Pontus ===
- Pythodorida of Pontus

=== Kingdom of Thrace ===
- Pythodoris II
- Antonia Tryphaena

=== Kingdom of Judea ===
- Salome I (in Jabneh) 4BC-10 AD
- Berenice (daughter of Herod Agrippa)

=== Prusias ad mare ===
- Orsabaris
- Orodaltis 1st century BC

=== Olba ===
- Aba 43-30 BC

=== British Tribes ===
==== Brigantes ====
- Cartimandua 43-69 AD

== See also ==
- Roman client kingdoms in Britain
- Ethnarchy of Comana
- Client kingdoms in ancient Rome
