= Tiberius Julius Chedosbius =

Chedosbius

King of the Bosporus
- Reign: 233–234 (?)
- Predecessor: Cotys III (alone) (?)
- Successor: Ininthimeus (?)
- Co-regents: Cotys III and Rhescuporis IV (?)
- Died: 234 (?)
- Dynasty: Tiberian-Julian

Chedosbius (Greek: Τιβέριος Ἰούλιος Χηδόσβιος, romanized: Tiberios Ioulios Chēdosbios) was an obscure king of the Bosporan Kingdom, a Roman client state. Chedosbius is only known from a single inscription, which gives his name and titles but no date. Beyond his placement at some point during the rule of the Tiberian-Julian dynasty (8 BC – AD 341), the timespan of his reign is unknown and disputed.

== Identity and chronology ==
The sole evidence of Chedosbius' existence and reign is a stele erected in Kherson. The Chedosbius stele was discovered in the form of two fragments in 1913, one fragment containing an inscription with his name and titles and another containing an image of the king wielding a sword. Whereas the letters used in the inscription are characteristic of the third and fourth centuries, the image of a king with a sword was more widespread in the first and second centuries, a period which was also characterized by this type of stele. Based on the image and the text, Michael Choref concluded in 2020 that Chedosbius was likely king in the first half of the third century as a co-ruler of one of the more well-attested Tiberian-Julian kings, most likely Rhescuporis IV (r. 233–234). Rhescuporis IV was himself a co-ruler of Cotys III.

Alternative proposed placements of Chedosbius in the chronology tend to solely be based on the text and not the image. He is sometimes speculatively inserted into gaps in the sequence of coinage from which no coins are known. Michael Rostovtzeff believed Chedosbius had succeeded Teiranes and preceded Theothorses, ruling 278–285/286. Though no coins are known from this timespan, it is otherwise believed to have accounted for Theothorses's early reign. Chedosbios's name might be of Gothic origin which could fit with Ivan Alekseevich Astakhov's theory that Theothorses became king through defeating a Gothic invasion.

Regnal titles
Preceded by Cotys III	King of the Bosporus; 233–234 with Cotys III & Rhescuporis IV	Succeeded by Ininthimeus
