= List of kings of the Cimmerian Bosporus =

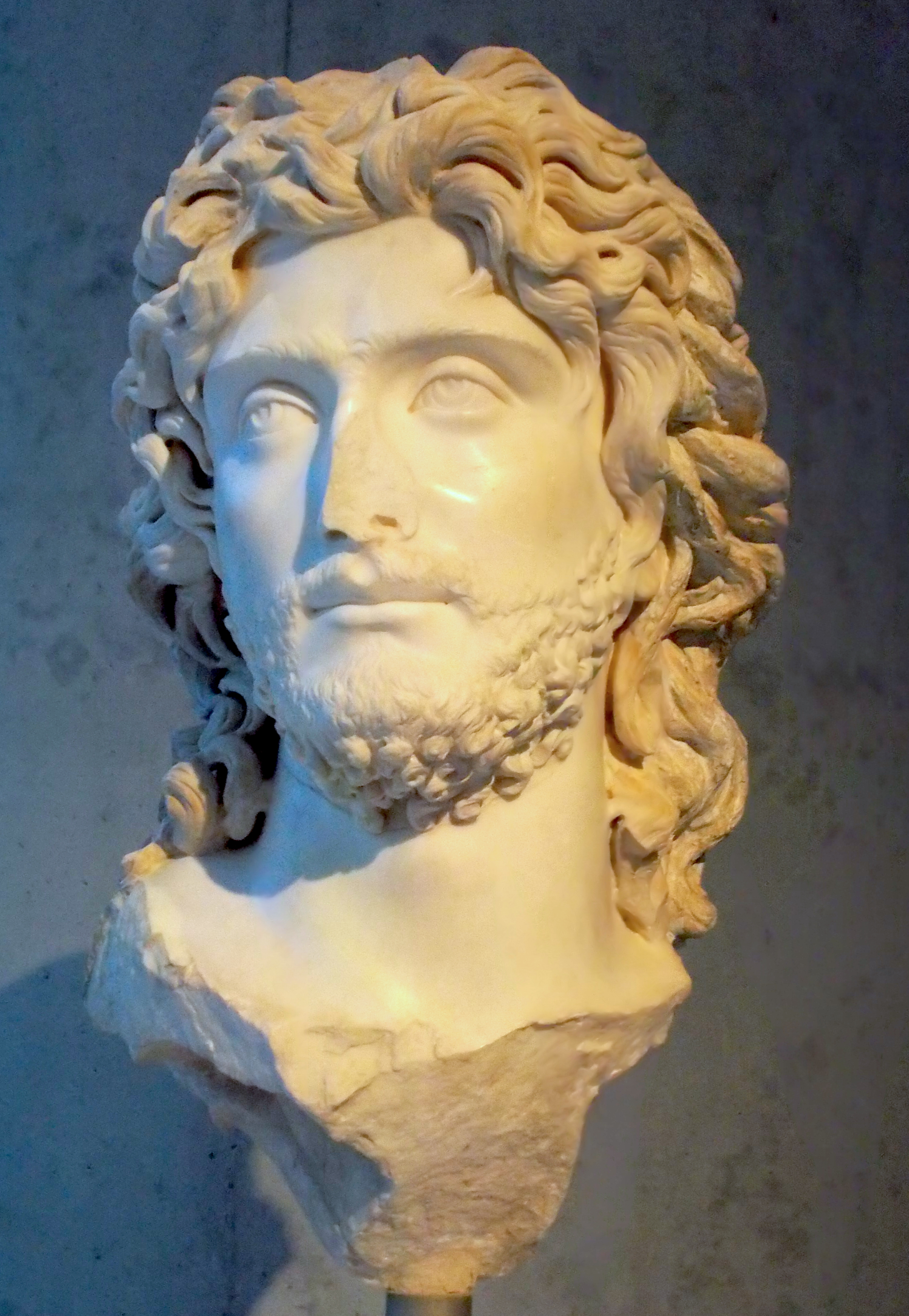
Bust of Sauromates II (r. AD 172–210) from the Acropolis Museum

The Bosporan kings were the rulers of the Bosporan Kingdom, an ancient Hellenistic Greco-Scythian state centered on the Kerch Strait (the Cimmerian Bosporus) and ruled from the city of Panticapaeum. Panticapaeum was founded in the 7th or 6th century BC; the earliest known king of the Bosporus is Archaeanax, who seized control of the city c. 480 BC as a usurper. The Archaeanactid dynasty ruled the city until it was displaced by the more long-lived Spartocid dynasty in 438 BC. After ruling for over three centuries, the Spartocids were then displaced by the Mithridatic dynasty of Pontus and then its offshoot the Tiberian-Julian dynasty. The Tiberian-Julian kings ruled as client kings of the Roman Empire until late antiquity.

After several successive periods of rule by groups such as the Sarmatians, Alans, Goths and Huns, the remnants of the Bosporan Kingdom were finally absorbed into the Roman Empire by Justinian I in the 6th century AD following a revolt against the Hunnic ruler Gordas.

== List of kings ==
Joint rulers are indicated with indentation.

=== Archaeanactid dynasty (c. 480–438 BC) ===
- Archaeanax c. 480 BC–?

The number of successors of Archaenax and their names are not known. (Note: Peter Truhart's Regents of Nations (2000) speculatively reconstructed the Archaeanactid dynasty as follows: Archaeanax (c. 480–470 BC), Paerisades (I) (c. 470–450 BC), Leukon (I) (c. 450–440 BC) and Sagauros (c. 440–438 BC).) His family ruled until c. 438 BC.

=== Spartocid dynasty (438–111 BC) ===
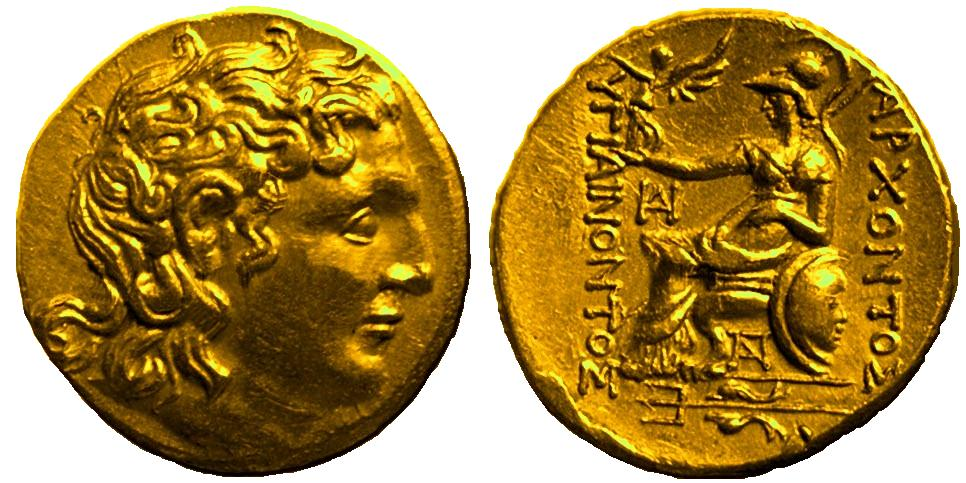
Coin of Hygiainon

- Spartokos I 438–433 BC
- Satyros I 433–389 BC
  - Seleukos 433–393 BC
- Leukon I 389–349 BC
  - Gorgippos 389–349 BC
- Paerisades I 349–311 BC
  - Spartokos II 349–344 BC
- Satyros II 311–310 BC
- Prytanis 310–309 BC
- Eumelos 309–304 BC
- Spartokos III 304 BC–284 BC
- Paerisades II 284–c. 250 BC
- Spartokos IV c. 250–c. 240 BC
- Leukon II c. 240–210 BC
- Hygiainon (regent) c. 210–c. 200 BC
- Spartokos V c. 200–c. 180 BC
- Kamasarye (queen) c. 180–c. 160 BC
  - Paerisades III c. 180–c. 170 BC
- Paerisades IV c. 170–c. 150 BC (with Kamasarye and then alone)
- Spartokos VI (?) c. 150–c. 140 BC
- Paerisades V c. 140–111 BC

=== Scythian rule (111–110 BC) ===
- Saumakos 111–110? BC

=== Mithridatic dynasty (110 BC–AD 8) ===
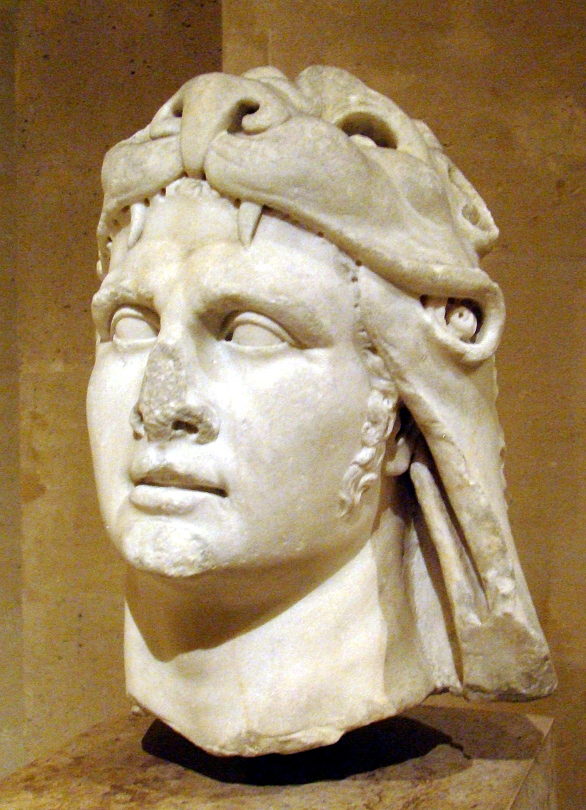
Bust of Mithridates VI Eupator of Pontus, who also ruled as Mithridates I of the Bosporus

- Mithridates I 110 BC–63 BC
- Pharnaces 63–48 BC
- Dynamis (queen) & Asander 48–47 BC (first reign)
- Mithridates II 47 BC–44/43 BC
- Dynamis (queen) 44/43 BC–c. AD 7/8 (second reign), with husbands:
  - Asander 44/43–c. 17 BC (second reign)
  - Scribonius c. 15? BC
  - Polemon I c. 12/13–8 BC

=== Tiberian-Julian dynasty (8–341) ===
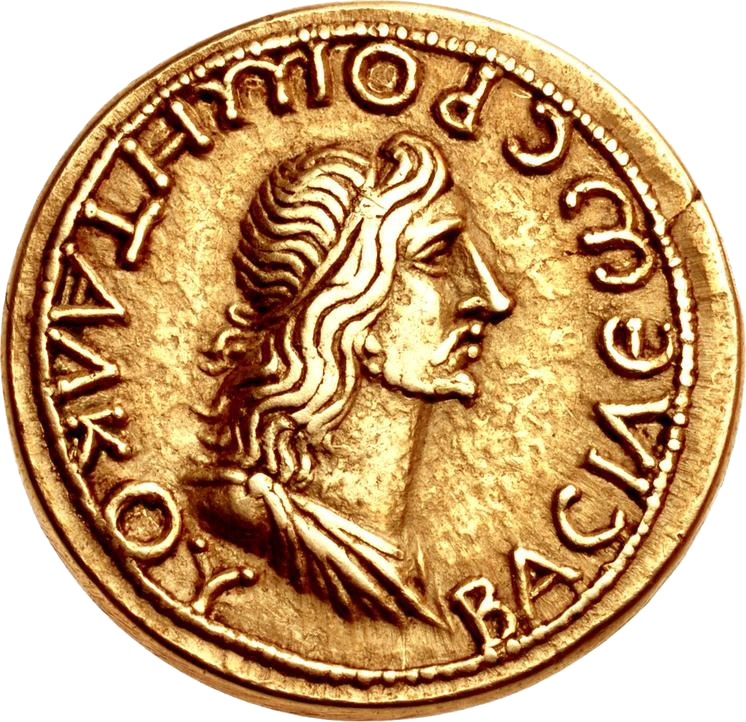
Coin of Rhoemetalces

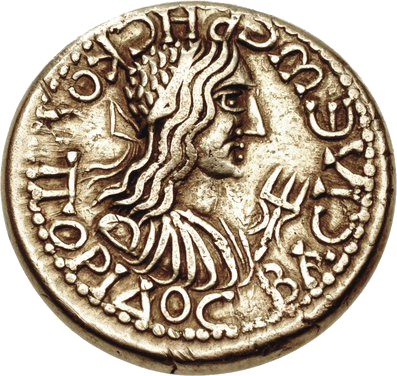
Coin of Rhescuporis III

- Aspurgus 8/10–38 AD
- Polemon II of Pontus 38–41
- Rhescuporis I (?) 14–42
- Gepaepyris (queen)
- Mithridates III 42–46
- Cotys I 46–78
  - Incorporated as a part of the Roman Province of Moesia Inferior 63–68
- Rhescuporis II 68–93
- Sauromates I 93–123
- Cotys II 123–131
- Rhoemetalces 131–153
- Eupator 154–170
- Sauromates II 172–210
- Rhescuporis III 211–228
- Cotys III 228–234
  - Sauromates III 229–232
  - Rhescuporis IV 233–234
  - Chedosbios 233–234 (?)
- Ininthimeus 234–239 (possibly non-dynastic)
- Rhescuporis V 240–276
  - Pharsanzes 253–254 (possibly non-dynastic)
- Teiranes 276–278
  - Sauromates IV 276
- Theothorses 279–309 (possibly non-dynastic)
- Rhadamsades 309–322 (possibly non-dynastic)
- Rhescuporis VI 314–341

=== Later rulers (341–527) ===
The end of Rhescuporis VI's reign is believed to have marked the end of the Tiberian-Julian dynasty. Details of the Bosporan Kingdom are scant thereafter but it appears to have undergone several successive periods of rule by Sarmatians, Alans, Goths and Huns. There was probably a continuous sequence of rulers but few names are known. (Note: In addition to the three certain names listed below, some authors speculate that Rhescuporis VI's immediate successors were two kings named Sauromates, i.e. Sauromates V and Sauromates VI. This is based on the writings of 10th-century emperor Constantine VII. Constantine's writings describe a post-Rhescuporis VI conflict with the Bosporans which is won by the Romans and notes that this victory meant that "the kingship of the Sauromati [was] finished".)

- Douptounos fl. c. 483
- Gordas fl. 527 (Hunnic ruler)
- Mugel c. 527 (Hunnic ruler)

Mugel's rule in the Bosporus was brief; shortly after Gordas's death Justinian I sent an army to place the Bosporus under Roman rule. Mugel thereafter ruled only Patria Onoguria in the north.

== Family tree ==
This family tree covers the rulers of the Mithridatic and Tiberian-Julian dynasties. Owing to much of the sequence of Tiberian-Julian rulers being based on coinage, the relationships within the Tiberian-Julian dynasty (especially for later rulers) are largely conjectural and speculative. Conjectural and speculative lines of descent are marked with dotted lines. Though genealogical information is completely unknown for kings after Cotys III, the repeating names lead most researchers to believe that the later kings until at least 341 were part of the same continuous dynasty.

Family tree of the Mithridatic and Tiberian-Julian dynasties

Mithridates VI Eupator (Mithridates I) r. 110–63 BC	Mark Antony
Pharnaces II (Pharnaces) r. 63–48 BC	Mithridates II r. 47–44/43 BC	Antonia
Asander r. 48–47; 44/43–17 BC	Dynamis r. 48–47; 44/43 BC–AD 7/8	Polemon I r. 12/13–8 BC	Pythorida
Antonia Tryphaena	Cotys III of Thrace
Aspurgus r. 8/10–38	Gepaepyris	Polemon II r. 38–41
Mithridates III r. 42–46	Cotys I r. 46–78	Eunice
Rhescuporis II r. 78–93
Sauromates I r. 93–123
Cotys II r. 123–131
Rhoemetalces r. 131–153	Eupator r. 154–170
Sauromates II r. 172–210
Rhescuporis III r. 211–228
Cotys III r. 228–234	Sauromates III r. 229–232
Rhescuporis IV r. 233–234	Ininthimeus r. 234–239	Rhescuporis V r. 240–276	Teiranes r. 276–278
Pharsanzes (?) r. 253–254	Sauromates IV r. 276	Theothorses r. 279–309
Rhadamsades r. 309–322	Rhescuporis VI r. 314–341	Nana	Mirian III of Iberia
Kings of Iberia

== See also ==
- Bosporan wars of expansion
- History of Ukraine
