= Pharsanzes =

King of Roman client state Bosporus from 253 to 254

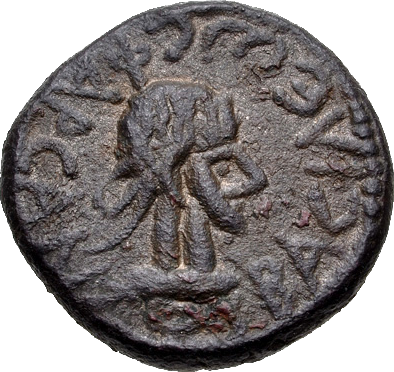
- Coin of Pharsanzes

King of the Bosporus
- Reign: 253–254
- Predecessor: Rhescuporis V
- Successor: Rhescuporis V
- Died: 254 (?)
- Dynasty: Tiberian-Julian (?)
- Father: Ininthimeus (?)

Pharsanzes (Greek: Τιβέριος Ἰούλιος Φαρσάνζης, romanized: Tiberios Ioulios Farsanzes), also known as Farsanza, was the king of the Bosporan Kingdom, a Roman client state, from 253 to 254. Virtually no historical information is known of Pharsanzes's reign on account of the king only being known from coinage. His reign overlaps completely with the reign of Rhescuporis V (r. 240–276). As a result, Pharsanzes is most frequently believed to have been a rival claimant or usurper, though some researchers believe he was a co-ruler granted power by Rhescuporis V.

== Biography ==
Pharsanzes is known only from coinage and as a result, little historical information is known of his reign. The origin of his name is disputed and it has been variously interpreted as of Iranian (Sarmatian-Alan, perhaps meaning "Power of Farn") or Gothic roots. His coins are comparatively rarer than coins of most other Bosporan kings.

Pharsanzes's coins place his reign as only encompassing a single year, 253–254, a period otherwise wholly encompassed by the reign of another king, Rhescuporis V (r. 240–276). Historians differ in interpretations of the nature of Pharsanzes's power and origins. Although the numismatist N. A. Frolova believes Pharsanzes to have been a co-ruler of Rhescuporis V, granted power so that Rhescuporis V could focus on military efforts somewhere else in the kingdom, the majority of researchers believe him to have been a rival claimant or usurper; perhaps another major contender to the Bosporan throne after the death of Rhescuporis V's predecessor Ininthimeus (r. 234–239). Whereas Rhescuporis is believed to have been the son of Sauromates III (r. 229–232), Pharsanzes might have been a closer relative of Ininthimeus. Another conjectural suggestion is that the kingdom might have briefly been divided into two, with Pharsanzes ruling the eastern side of the Bosporus and later being deposed by Rhescuporis V again.

Among those who believe him to have been a usurper, views on whether Pharsanzes seized power violently or was reluctantly granted it by Rhescuporis V to avert civil war also differ. M. M. Choref believes Pharsanzes took power with the support of the various barbarian tribes in the kingdom. Other researchers have proposed that Pharsanzes was responsible for inviting various barbarian groups into the kingdom to aid him in taking the throne; circumstantial evidence may lend support to this idea, since the appearance of larger numbers of barbarians in the Bosporus coincides with his reign and the number of coins of Pharsanzes at sites inhabited by Gothic tribes is much greater than at other sites. His barbarian-aided takeover of the kingdom could perhaps have been the conflict during which the city of Tanais was destroyed.

If Pharsanzes was a usurper, the appearance of coins minted by Rhescuporis V again after 254 indicates that he was defeated. It is possible that Rhescuporis V defeated him with the aid of Germanic mercenaries since Germanic archaeological finds also begin appearing in the Bosporus around this time.

Regnal titles
Preceded by Rhescuporis V	King of the Bosporus; 253–254	Succeeded by Rhescuporis V
