= Archaeanax =

- Ruler of the Bosporan Kingdom
- Reign: 480-? BC
- Predecessor: Position Established
- Successor: ?
- Born: Mytilene
- Died: 470 BC? Bosporan Kingdom
- Greek: Αρχαιάναξ
- House: Archaeanactids
- Father: Unknown
- Mother: Unknown
- Religion: Greek Polytheism

Archaeanax (Greek: Αρχαιάναξ) seems to have been a ruler of the Bosporan Kingdom some 40 years prior to the ascent of the Thracian Spartocids.

== Biography ==
Little to nothing is known about Archaeanax prior to his ascent to the throne. He may have been a native of Mytilene and a strategos of a league of city-states in the Cimmerian Bosporus that likely formed as a defense of the neighboring Scythian tribes. After taking power as ruler, the cities of the Theodosia and Nymphaeum left the league. It is possible that he was related to Semandrus of Mytilene, founder of the city of Hermonassa, though this is uncertain.
