= Rhadamsades =

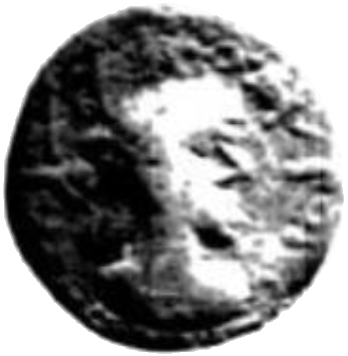
- Coin of Rhadamsades

King of the Bosporus
- Reign: 309–322
- Predecessor: Theothorses
- Successor: Rhescuporis VI
- Co-regent: Rhescuporis VI (314–322)
- Born: c. 290 (?)
- Died: 322 (aged c. 32?)
- Dynasty: Tiberian-Julian (?)
- Father: Theothorses (?)

Rhadamsades (Ancient Greek: Τιβέριος Ἰούλιος Ῥαδαμσάδης, romanized: Tiberios Ioulios Radamsades), also known as Radamsad, Rhadamsadius (Ancient Greek: Ῥαδαμσάδιος) or Rhadampsadius, was the king of the Bosporan Kingdom, a Roman client state, from 309 to 322. For the last five years of his reign he ruled together with Rhescuporis VI, who became the sole king upon Rhadamsades's death. It is possible that Rhadamsades, perhaps of Sarmatian or Alan origin, is the same person as Rausimod, a barbarian king who invaded Pannonia in 322 and was killed by the forces of Constantine the Great.

== Origin ==
Rhadamsades became king of the Bosporan Kingdom in 309, succeeding Theothorses. Nothing is known of his origin and relationship to other kings. Like his predecessor Theothorses, his name is of Iranian origin, which could indicate that he was a Sarmatian or Alan tribal leader or nobleman who seized power, rather than a genuine member of the previous Bosporan ruling Tiberian-Julian dynasty. The name in of itself is not wholly convincing evidence since the dynasty itself was originally of partly Sarmatian origin. The French genealogist Christian Settipani believes Rhadamsades to have been born c. 290 as a son of Theothorses.

== Reign ==
Rhadamsades shared power with another Bosporan king, Rhescuporis VI, from 314 until the end of his reign. Rhescuporis VI's name suggests that he was of Bosporan origin and a genuine Tiberian-Julian dynast. It is not clear whether Rhadamsades and Rhescuporis VI co-ruled in peace or if they were competing claimants. Settipani believes Rhescuporis VI to have been the younger brother of Rhadamsades.

According to the writings of the fifth-century historian Zosimus and the tenth-century emperor Constantine VII, an army of Sarmatians and Maeotians invaded Pannonia in 322 under the command of the king Rausimod, perhaps identifiable with Rhadamsades. Rausimod is said to have been defeated, pursued and killed by the forces of Constantine the Great in 322; the Bosporan Rhadamsades is also known to have died in 322.

Regnal titles
Preceded by Theothorses	King of the Bosporus; 309–322 with Rhescuporis VI (314–322)	Succeeded by Rhescuporis VI
