= Ininthimeus =

King of Roman client state Bosporus from 234 to 239

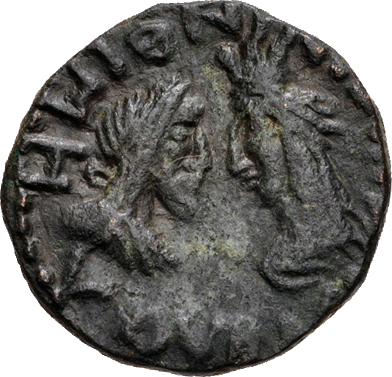
- Copper denarius of Ininthimeus (left), also depicting Aphrodite Urania (right); legend ININΘΙΜΗ[ΟΥ]. (Other side: Aphrodite seated holding phiale and apple). 21 mm, 7.25 g, c. 234/5-238/9.

King of the Bosporus
- Reign: 234–239
- Predecessor: Cotys III & Rhescuporis IV
- Successor: Rhescuporis V
- Died: 239 (?)
- Issue: Pharsanzes (?)
- Dynasty: Tiberian-Julian (?)
- Father: Cotys III (?)

Ininthimeus (Greek: Τιβέριος Ἰούλιος Ἰνινθίμηος, romanized: Tiberios Ioulios Ininthimeos), also known as Ininthimaios, Ininthimeos or Ininthimaeus, was the king of the Bosporan Kingdom, a Roman client state, from 234 to 239. His origin and lineage are uncertain; he might have been a member of the ruling Tiberian-Julian dynasty or alternatively perhaps a foreign usurper. Inintimeus's reign was marked by large-scale construction projects for defensive structures throughout the kingdom.

== Biography ==
Ininthimeus became king of the Bosporan Kingdom in 234, succeeding Cotys III and Rhescuporis IV. Although he used a different tamga (a type of seal/symbol) than his recent predecessors, it is still possible that he belonged to the same dynasty (the Tiberian-Julian dynasty). Like previous kings, Ininthimeus used the names Tiberius and Julius. It is also possible that he was a foreign usurper, perhaps of Sarmatian or Alan descent. If he was a Tiberian-Julian dynast, it is possible that he was a younger son of Cotys III and a brother of Rhescuporis IV.

The name Ininthimeus is reminiscent of Inismeus, a 1st-century Sarmatian king of Olbia. A Sarmatian connection of the name would not necessarily mean that Ininthimeus was a usurper; the Tiberian-Julian dynasty itself was of partly Sarmatian origin.

Ininthimeus ruled during a period of increasing barbarian pressure on the Bosporan Kingdom. To combat threats from migrating tribes, Ininthimeus is known to have constructed new fortifications throughout the kingdom, including further developing the fortress of Iluraton in Panticapaeum.

The coinage of Ininthimeus is unique among the coins of the Bosporan kings. In addition to including a bust of the king himself, the coins of Ininthimeus also include a bust of the deity Aphrodite Urania, facing Ininthimeus.

After a reign of only five years, Ininthimeus died in 239 and was succeeded as king by Rhescuporis V. Rhescuporis V claimed the kingdom by hereditary right; he might have been the son of the previous ruler Sauromates III (r. 229–232). It is possible that Inthimeus's death marked the beginning of dynastic conflicts. The later king Pharsanzes (r. 253–254) might have been closely connected to Inthimeus and might have fought with Rhescuporis V for the throne.

Regnal titles
Preceded by Cotys III & Rhescuporis IV	King of the Bosporus; 234–239	Succeeded by Rhescuporis V
