= Tiberian-Julian dynasty =

Third dynasty of the Bosporan kingdom (1st to 4th-century)

The Tiberian-Julian dynasty was the third and last dynasty of the kingdom of the Cimmerian Bosporus. The members of it bare the names Tiberius Julius before their names, on behalf of the Roman Emperor Tiberius. The first member of the family is Tiberius Julius Aspurgus.

== History ==
The Mithridatic dynasty ruled the kingdom of the Bosporus, with its last member being Dynamis. Because of the Romans, the Kingdom of Pontus was reduced to that of the Bosporus (today Kerch Strait) and it was a client kingdom to Rome. Dynamis had three husbands, acting as kings. Maybe from her first husband Asander, she had a son Aspurgus, whom he accepter the Roman Senate, then Augustus and later his son Tiberius Julius. Aspurgus received the Roman citizenship, and the praenomen Tiberius Julius; all his descendants keep this praenomen. He married Gepaepyris, daughter of Cotys III (Sapaean) king of Thrace and some of his descendants had thracian royal names like Cotys, Rhescouporis and Roemetalces.

Gepaepyris was daughter of Antonia Tryphaena (2nd cousin of Caligula), daughter of Pythodorida of Pontus (cousin of Claudius and 2nd cousin of Nero), which in turn was daughter of Antonia Prima (niece of Augustus), daughter of the triumvir Mark Antony. The dynasty had strong family relations to Roman Emperors, and the kingdom lasted longer than any other Hellenistic one. The dynasty lasted as for 12 generations and had 22 kings, much more than the previous three dynasties in the kingdom of Bosporus. The last king died on 342 AD, when Constantius II was Emperor. Then the Huns captured the kingdom, after that Utigurs and later Goths. The kingdom came to Roman Empire under Justinian II.

== Tiberian-Julian dynasty: a possible family tree ==
Antonia Prima ∞ Pythodoros of Tralles	Mithridates VI Eupator ∞ Laodice
Pythodorida of Pontus ∞ Polemon I of Pontus	Pharnaces II of Pontus
Antonia Tryphaena ∞ Cotys III (Sapaean)	Asander (king)	Dynamis
Gepaepyris	T. J. Aspurgus; TIBERIAN-JULIAN DYNASTY
T. J. Mithridates	T. J. Cotys I ∞ Eunice (Bosporan queen)
T. J. Rhescuporis I
T. J. Sauromates I
T. J. Cotys II
T. J. Rhoemetalces	T. J. Eupator
T. J. Sauromates II
T. J. Rhescuporis III
T. J. Cotys III	T. J. Sauromates III
T. J. Rhescuporis IV	T. J. Ininthimeus	T. J. Rhescuporis V	T. J. Teiranes
T. J. Pharsanzes	T. J. Sauromates IV	T. J. Theothorses
T. J. Rhadamsades	T. J. Rhescuporis VI

== See also ==
- Bosporan Kingdom
- Roman Crimea
