= Rhescuporis V =

King of Roman client state Bosporus from 240 to 276

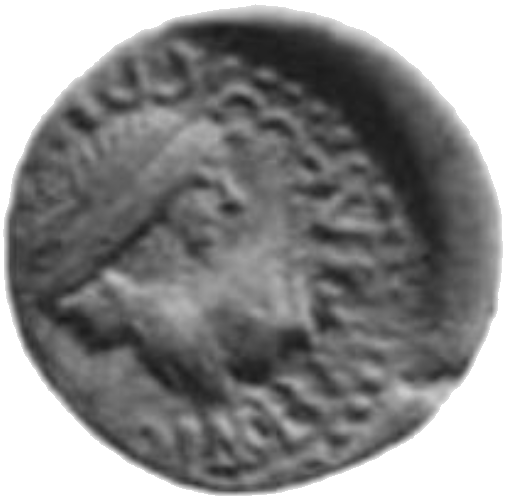
- Coin of Rhescuporis V

King of the Bosporus
- Reign: 240–276
- Predecessor: Ininthimeus
- Successor: Teiranes
- Co-regents: Pharsanzes (253–254); Sauromates IV (276); Teiranes (276)
- Born: c. 225 (?)
- Died: 276 (aged c. 51?)
- Issue: Sauromates IV (?); Theothorses (?)
- Dynasty: Tiberian-Julian
- Father: Sauromates III (?)

Rhescuporis V (Greek: Τιβέριος Ἰούλιος Ῥησκούπορις, romanized: Tiberios Ioulios Rheskoúporis), also transliterated as Rheskuporis or Rheskouporis, was the king of the Bosporan Kingdom, a Roman client state, from 240 to 276. The reign of Rhescuporis V overlaps with those of several other Bosporan kings; Pharsanzes (253–254), Sauromates IV (276) and Teiranes (276–278). It is unclear what their relationships and status were relative to each other and if they were co-rulers or rival contenders for the throne.

== Biography ==
Rhescuporis V became king of the Bosporan Kingdom in 240, succeeding Ininthimeus. Because the late Bosporan kings are known only from coinage, the precise relationship between the rulers is not known. Ininthimeus is variously thought to have been either a member of the ruling Tiberian-Julian dynasty (perhaps the son of Cotys III) or a foreign usurper, perhaps of Sarmatian descent. According to a 249 inscription left by Rhescuporis V at Panticapaeum, he claimed the throne of the Bosporan Kingdom by hereditary right. The French genealogist Christian Settipani believes Rhescuporis V to have been born c. 225 as the son of the previous king Sauromates III (r. 229–232).

Little is known from the reign of Rhescuporis V but the fact that the period during which he minted coins overlaps with the reigns of several other kings suggests that he was either faced with numerous usurpers or that he frequently co-ruled with relatives. The first king to be contemporary with Rhescuporis V was Pharsanzes, whose coins are known from 253 to 254. Whether Pharsanzes was a usurper or not is disputed, though he is most frequently believed by historians to have been a rival contender rather than a co-ruler, perhaps a closer relative of Ininthimeus or an unrelated foreigner.

Rhescuporis V is sometimes thought to have co-ruled with a king named "Synges" from 258 to 276. The identification of Synges is doubtful since it is based on a rare type of coins out of which only a single one preserves a partial inscription. This inscription was read as "Synges" by the numismatist Bernhard Karl von Koehne in the mid-19th century but was considered fanciful by Aleksandr Zograf in 1977.

More securely attested co-rulers are known from Rhescuporis V's final year, 276, when he ruled together with the two other kings Teiranes and Sauromates IV. Christian Settipani believes Teiranes to have been Rhescuporis V's brother and it is possible that Sauromates IV was Rhescuporis V's son. Settipani additionally believes that the later king Theothorses (279–309) was a younger son of Rhescuporis V.

Sauromates IV also died in 276 after less than a year as co-ruler, leaving Teiranes as Rhescuporis V's sole successor.

Regnal titles
Preceded by Ininthimeus	King of the Bosporus; 240–276 with Pharsanzes (253–254), Sauromates IV (276) and Teiranes (276)	Succeeded by Teiranes
