= Sauromates IV =

King of Roman client state Bosporus in 276

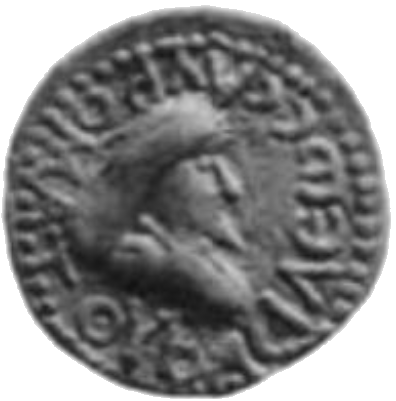
- Coin of Sauromates IV, legend: BACILEΩC CAYΡOMATOY.

King of the Bosporus
- Reign: 276
- Predecessor: Rhescuporis V
- Successor: Teiranes
- Co-regents: Teiranes (276)
- Died: 276
- Dynasty: Tiberian-Julian
- Father: Rhescuporis V (?)

Sauromates IV (Greek: Τιβέριος Ἰούλιος Σαυροματης Δ', flourished 3rd century – died 276) was a Roman client king of the Bosporan Kingdom. Like the other late Bosporan kings, Sauromates IV is known only from coinage, which means his relationship to the other kings is unknown, as are details of his accession and reign. His coins are known only from 276, when he apparently co-ruled with Rhescuporis V and Teiranes. It is possible that he was a son of Rhescuporis V.

== See also ==
- Bosporan Kingdom
- Roman Crimea

Preceded by Rhescuporis V	King of the Bosporus; 276 (with Teiranes)	Succeeded by Teiranes
