= Archaeanactid dynasty =

5th-century BC Greek rulers of the Kingdom of Bosporus

The Archaeanactids or Archaeanactidae (Ancient Greek: Ἀρχαιανακτίδαι) were presumably a Greek dynasty of the Bosporan Kingdom that ruled from 480 until 438 BC.

The presumed founder, Archaeanax, was probably a strategos of a league of city-states in the Cimmerian Bosporus, likely formed as a defense against foreign threats. After taking power, Archaeanax caused the cities of Theodosia and Nymphaeum to withdraw from the league. Throughout their reign, Panticapaeum and her surrounding cities had an age of economic growth as well as the construction of new temples and replanning of all city parts. They were later succeeded by a hellenized family of Thracians, called the Spartocids.
