= Rhescuporis VI =

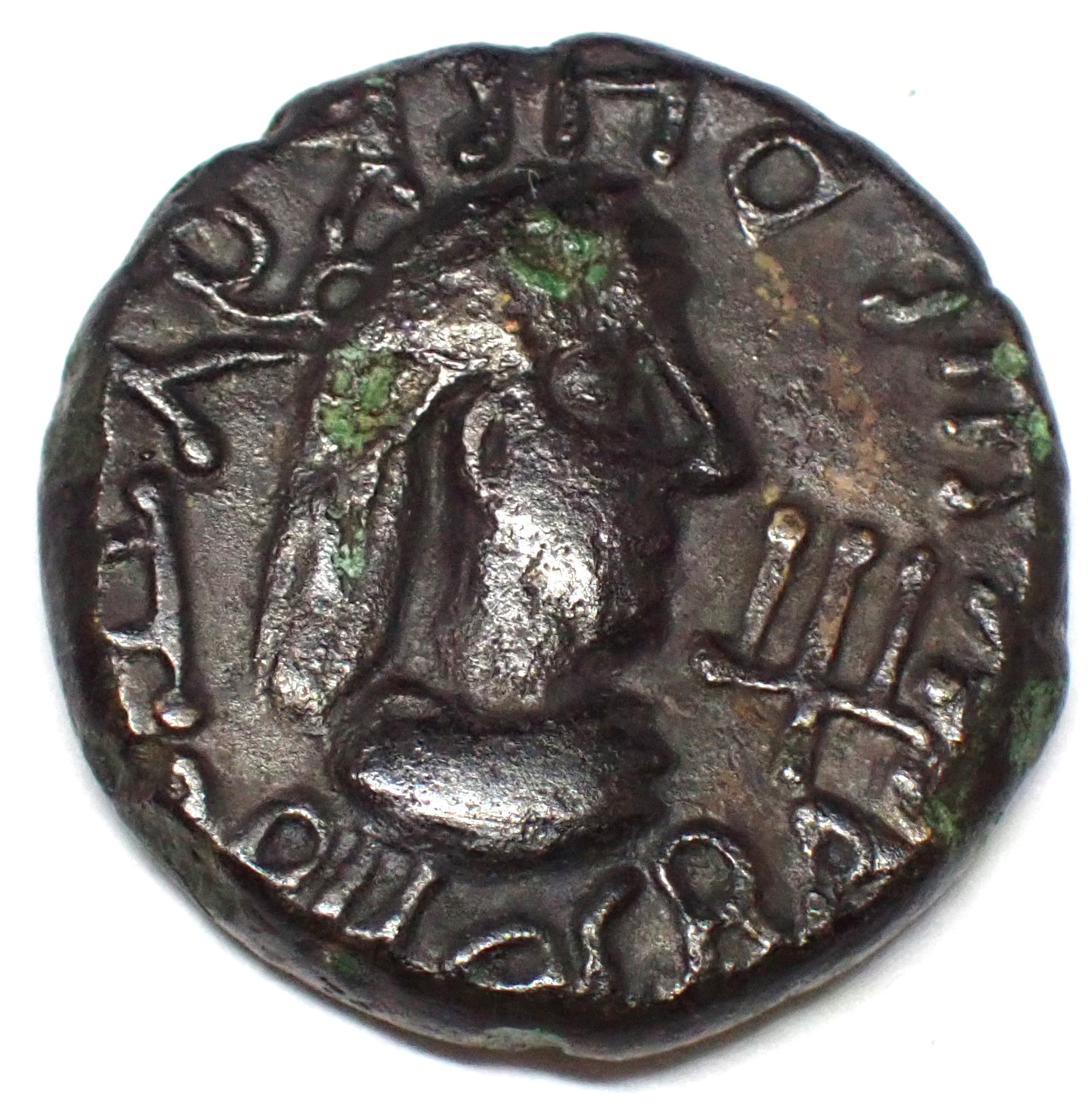
- Coin of Rhescuporis VI

King of the Bosporus
- Reign: 314–341
- Predecessor: Rhadamsades
- Successor: Unknown
- Co-regent: Rhadamsades (314–322)
- Died: 341 (?)
- Dynasty: Tiberian-Julian
- Father: Theothorses (?)

Rhescuporis VI (Greek: Τιβέριος Ἰούλιος Ῥησκούπορις, romanized: Tiberios Ioulios Rheskoúporis), also transliterated as Rheskuporis or Rheskouporis and sometimes known as Rhescuporis the Last, is the last well-known king of the Bosporan Kingdom (r. 314–341), a Roman client state, and the last known representative of its ancient Tiberian-Julian ruling dynasty. Little is known of the background and reign of Rhescuporis VI; he began his tenure as king through either co-rule or competition with his predecessor Rhadamsades until 322. Rhescuporis VI's reign came to an end around 341, when he might have been overthrown by the Sarmatians or Alans, groups which at the time were becoming increasingly influential and powerful in Crimea.

== Reign ==
The last known member of the Tiberian-Julian dynasty, Rhescuporis VI's reign can be dated precisely through numismatic (coins) and archaeological data, which places him as ruling from 314 to 341. His reign overlaps with the other Bosporan king Rhadamsades (r. 309–322), who in turn had succeeded Theothorses (r. 279–309). The relationship between Rhescuporis VI and his immediate predecessors (and co-ruler in the case of Rhadamsades) is not outlined in any surviving source. The French genealogist Christian Settipani believes Rhescuporis VI to have been the younger brother of Rhadamsades and a son of Theothorses.

It has been pointed out, for instance by Astakhov (2021), that Rhadamsades and Theothorses are Iranian names and that these two kings might thus not have been genuine representatives of the Tiberian-Julian dynasty. Further indicating an Iranian origin for Theothorses is the addition of a Sarmatian sign to his otherwise traditional Bosporan coinage. Coins from the last two years of Theothorses's reign are rarer than in preceding years which could indicate internal trouble in the kingdom, perhaps conflict either with the Bosporan aristocracy or Roman authorities owing to his non-dynastic rise to the throne. The Iranian origin of the names and the Sarmatian sign on Theothorses's coins is not wholly convincing evidence since the Tiberian-Julian dynasty itself was of partly Sarmatian origin (Rhescuporis for instance being a name of Sarmatian origin) and tamgas were frequently used symbols in the kingdom.

The end of Rhescuporis VI's reign is generally connected by historians to the end of Bosporan coin production in 341, though there are no surviving sources to confirm this. Given that sources on the Bosporus from after 341 nearly non-existent, Rhescuporis VI is often referred to as the last king of the Bosporan Kingdom. Traditionally the Bosporan Kingdom is believed to have been destroyed by the Goths and the Huns at the end of his reign but there is no evidence for this. Bosporan coin troves from the early 4th century throughout the territory of the kingdom are likely connected to the activity of Iranian Sarmatian and Alan tribes in the region; the increasing power and influence of these tribes suggest that Rhescuporis VI might have been overthrown by a Sarmatian or Alan tribal leader.

== Fate of the Bospororan Kingdom ==
=== Succession ===
The next well-attested king of the Bosporan Kingdom after Rhescuporis VI is Douptounos, who is known from an inscription where he is claimed to have been part of the Tiberian-Julian dynasty. Though the dating of the Douptounos inscription is debated, one relatively widely accepted date is 483, nearly a century and a half after Rhescuporis VI. It is evident that the Bosporan Kingdom was in deep political crisis in the time of Rhescuporis VI but archaeological data also shows that life went on in the cities of the kingdom and even indicate a recovering economy. Although the evidence is limited, it is as a result considered unlikely that the line of Bosporan kings came to an end for over a century.

Some attempts have been made to reconstruct the line of successors to Rhescuporis VI, notably by Richard Garnett in the late 19th century, through the writings of 10th-century emperor Constantine VII. Constantine's writings describe a post-Rhescuporis VI conflict with the Bosporans which is won by the Romans and notes that this victory meant that "the kingship of the Sauromati [was] finished", a line interpreted by Garnett as suggesting that Rhescuporis VI was succeeded by two kings named Sauromates. Modern scholars consider such a reconstruction overly speculative.

If Rhescuporis VI was overthrown by a Sarmatian or Alan leader, he may have been succeeded as king by a Sarmatian or Alan nobleman. After a short-lived Sarmatian-Alanian dynasty, it is apparent that the Goths took power over at least parts of the Bosporan Kingdom c. 380. That there was a Gothic takeover is among other evidence clear from a 404 letter to John Chrysostom, archbishop of Constantinople, in which a rex Gothiorum ("king of the Goths") requests a new bishop to the Bosporus; the only sufficiently powerful state in the region to support a diocese was the Bosporan Kingdom.

=== End of the kingdom ===
The period of Gothic rule was likely followed by a Hunnic invasion; whether the Bosporan Kingdom was temporarily destroyed or became an autonomous vassal state of the Hunnic Empire is not clear. After the Huns suffered defeats in the 450s and 460s, the Bosporus region, like other lands under Hunnic rule, probably became fully independent once more. As evidenced by the 6th-century Roman author Procopius writing that the Utigurs fought and then allied with the "Goths-tetraxites" in the Crimea, the Goths still ruled the region by this point. Eventually, the Goths appear to have left or been driven away from the Bosporus, leading to the resumption of Hellenistic rule under figures like Douptounos, who re-oriented the kingdom towards the Roman Empire as a client state. Beyond Douptounos use of Rome-friendly epithets and the assumption of the names Tiberius and Julius, alignment towards Rome is also indicated by the presence of coins from the reigns of emperors Justin I (r. 518–527) and Justinian I (r. 527–565) in the Crimea. By the time of Justinian I, the ruler of the Bosporan realm was the Hunnish king Gordas. Gordas converted to Christianity under Justinian's sponsorship at Constantinople in 527, but was killed in a revolt upon his return home owing to his attempts at forcible conversion of his supporters and the populace. After Gordas's death, a Roman army was sent to the Bosporus which quelled the uprising and established imperial control there.

Regnal titles
Preceded by Rhadamsades	King of the Bosporus; 314–341 with Rhadamsades (314–322)	Unknown
