= Tiberius Julius Rhescuporis IV =

King of the Bosporus

Rhescuporis IV
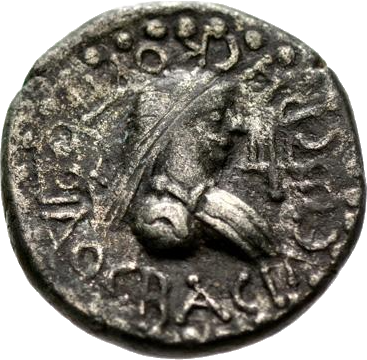
- Billon tetradrachm of the Bosporan king Rhescuporis IV, trident right, legend: BACIΛEΩC ΡHCΚΟΥΠΟΡΙΔΟC. (Other side: busts of Valerian and Galleian, year ΦΞ΄ = 560 = 263/4). 20 mm, 6.98 g.

King of the Bosporus
- Reign: 233 - 234
- Predecessor: Cotys III; Sauromates III
- Successor: Ininthimeus
- Co-regents: Cotys III
- Died: 234
- Dynasty: Tiberian-Julian
- Father: Cotys III (?)

Rhescuporis IV (Greek: Τιβέριος Ἰούλιος Ῥησκούπορις Δ'; fl. 3rd century – 234) was a Roman client king of the Bosporan Kingdom. Like many other late Bosporan kings, Rhescuporis IV is known only from coinage, which means his relationship to the other kings is unknown, as are details of his accession and reign. His coins are known from the period 233–234, meaning that he appears to have co-ruled with Cotys III (r. 228–234).

== See also ==
- Bosporan Kingdom
- Roman Crimea

Preceded by Cotys III and Sauromates III	King of the Bosporus; 233-234 (with Cotys III)	Succeeded by Ininthimeus
