= Teiranes =

Ruler of the Bosporus Kingdom, 276 to 278

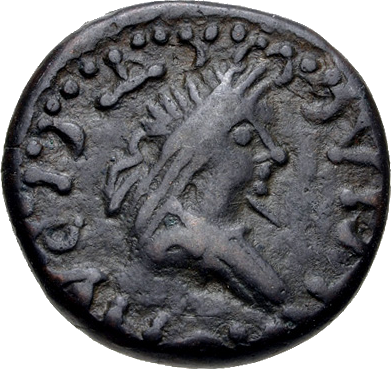
- Copper stater (20 mm, 7.85 g.) Obv.: Diademed head of Teiranes, legend: ΒΑCΙΛΕΩC ΤΕΙΡΑΝΟΥ. (Rev.: Laureate bust of Florian or Probus, year ΦΟΓ΄ = 573 = 276/7 ΑD.)

King of the Bosporus
- Reign: 276 - 278
- Predecessor: Rescuporis V
- Successor: Theothorses
- Co-regent: Rhescuporis V 276; Sauromates IV 276
- Died: 278
- Dynasty: Tiberian-Julian dynasty
- Father: Sauromates III (?)

Teiranes (Greek: Τιβέριος Ἰούλιος Τειράνης; died 278) was a Roman client king of the Bosporan Kingdom. Like the other late Bosporan kings, Teiranes is known only from coinage, which means his relationship to the other kings is unknown, as are details of his accession and reign. His coins are known from the period 276–278. In 276, he apparently co-ruled with his predecessor Rhescuporis V and another king, Sauromates IV. It is possible that Teiranes was the son of Sauromates III and a brother Rhescuporis V.

== See also ==
- Bosporan Kingdom
- Roman Crimea

Preceded by Rhescuporis V	King of the Bosporus; 276–278; With: Rhescuporis V 276; Sauromates IV 276	Succeeded by Theothorses
