= Theothorses =

King of Roman client state Bosporus from 279 to 309

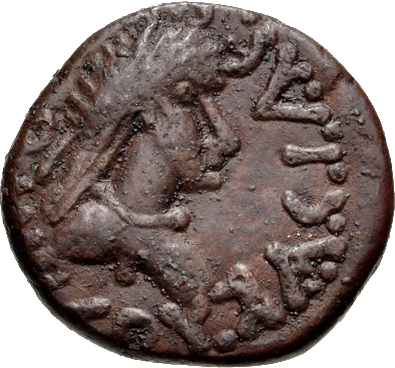
- Copper stater of the Bosporan king Theothorses, legend: ΒΑCIΛΕΩC ΘΕΟΘΟΡCΟΥ. (Other side: head of Galerius, tagra (right), year ΦΡΑ΄ = 591 = 294/5). 18 mm, 6.55 g.

King of the Bosporus
- Reign: 279–309
- Predecessor: Teiranes
- Successor: Rhadamsades
- Born: c. 260 (?)
- Died: 309 (aged c. 49?)
- Issue: Rhadamsades (?); Rhescuporis VI (?); Nana (?)
- Dynasty: Tiberian-Julian (?)
- Father: Rhescuporis V (?)

Theothorses (Greek: Τιβέριος Ἰούλιος Θοθώρσης, romanized: Tiberios Ioulios Thothorses), (Note: There is no evidence that Theothorses used the names Tiberius and Julius, though they were used by the other Bosporan kings of his time.) also known as Thothorses, Fophors or Fofors, was the king of the Bosporan Kingdom, a Roman client state, from 279 to 309. His reign coincided with the Crisis of the Third Century and the Tetrarchy in the Roman Empire.

Like most of the late Bosporan kings, Theothorses is known only from coinage. The nature of his origin and rise to the throne is disputed; some scholars regard him to have been a member of the incumbent Bosporan Tiberian-Julian dynasty whereas others believe him to have been a barbarian warlord who usurped power. His reign appears to have seen conflict with the Roman Empire and within his kingdom and the degradation in quality of the Bosporan coinage.

== Origin ==
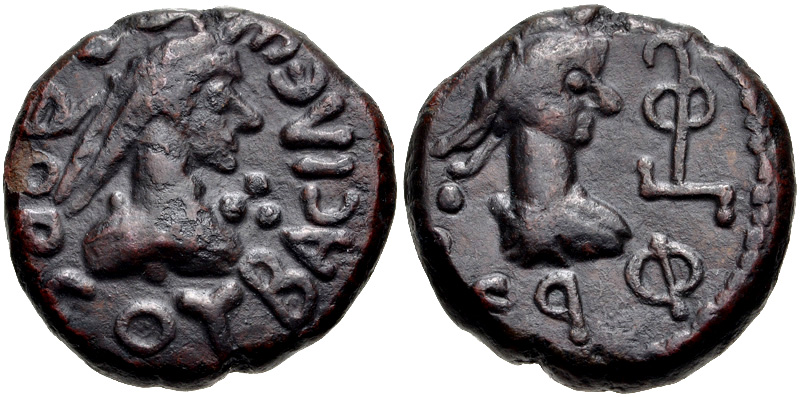
Copper stater of the Bosporan king Theothorses, legend: ΒΑCΙΛΕΩC ΘΕΟΘΟΡCΟY. Other side: head of Diocletian, tamga (right), year ΦΡΕ΄ = 595 = 298/9. 18 mm, 7.64 g.

Theothorses became king of the Bosporan Kingdom in 279, succeeding Teiranes. On account of lacking source material, the relationship between Theothorses and his predecessors is not clear. He is sometimes believed to have been part of the same dynasty (the Tiberian-Julian dynasty), but some evidence has also been interpreted as suggesting he was a usurper of Sarmatian or Alan origin.

The most notable evidence for a foreign origin is that Theothorses is not a Greek name but rather a name of Iranian origin, making it unlikely to be adopted by a genuine member of the Tiberian-Julian dynasty. Furthermore, Theothorses's otherwise traditional Bosporan coinage incorporates a tamga, a type of symbol usually used by Eurasian nomads. Ivan Alekseevich Astakhov considers it "undoubtable" that Theothorses was a member of the Sarmatian or Alan aristocracy and seized power in the Bosporus after defeating a Gothic invasion in the middle/late 3rd century.

The evidence of Theothorses being a barbarian does not necessarily mean that he was not part of the Tiberian-Julian dynasty; the dynasty itself was of partly Sarmatian origins, with the common names Sauromates and Rhescuporis also being of Sarmatian origin, and tamgas were frequently used symbols in the kingdom, including on coinage. The French genealogist Christian Settipani believes Theothorses to have been born c. 260 as a son of the previous king Rhescuporis V (r. 240–276) and a nephew of Teiranes.

== Reign ==
Coins minted by Theothorses are known from 286/287 to the end of his reign. Some of Theothorses's early coins had surfaces of silver but a lack of available materials led to the coinage to degrade over the course of his reign; shortly after his accession, Theothorses went over to only minting bronze coins. Coins from the last five years of his reign are considerably rarer than during preceding times, which could suggest either conflict within the kingdom or conflict with the Roman Empire, perhaps resulting from his possible non-dynastic rise to the throne or from conflict between pro-Roman and anti-Roman parties in the kingdom.

An inscription from the last few years of Theothorses's reign from the city of Theodosia by its governor, Aurelius Valerius Sogus, indicates that the city was at this time incorporated into the Roman Empire (due to Sogus using imperial titles and paying homage to the incumbent emperors rather than to Theothorses and calling Theodosia a "province"). Combined with brief mentions of a Bosporan campaign in the Transcaucasus and Asia Minor in later sources, possibly taking place in 292–293, Sogus's inscription was interpreted by Benjamin Nadel in 1977 as indicating that Theodosia had temporarily been incorporated into the empire after Theothorses attacked Roman possessions and was defeated. This temporary loss of territory could in combination with internal conflict help explain the scarce coins from his late reign.

Theothorses died in 309 and was succeeded by Rhadamsades. The precise relationship between the two kings is not known but Rhadamsades is also a name of Iranian origin. If Theothorses was a Sarmatian or Alan aristocrat the same might also be true for Rhadamsades. Settipani believes Theothorses to have been Rhadamsades's father, as well as the father of the later king Rhescuporis VI. Settipani also identifies Theothorses as the father of Nana, the queen of Mirian III of Iberia.

== Notes ==
Regnal titles
Preceded by Teiranes	King of the Bosporus; 279–309	Succeeded by Rhadamsades
