= Sauromates III =

King of Roman client state Bosporus from 229 to 232

T. J. Sauromates III
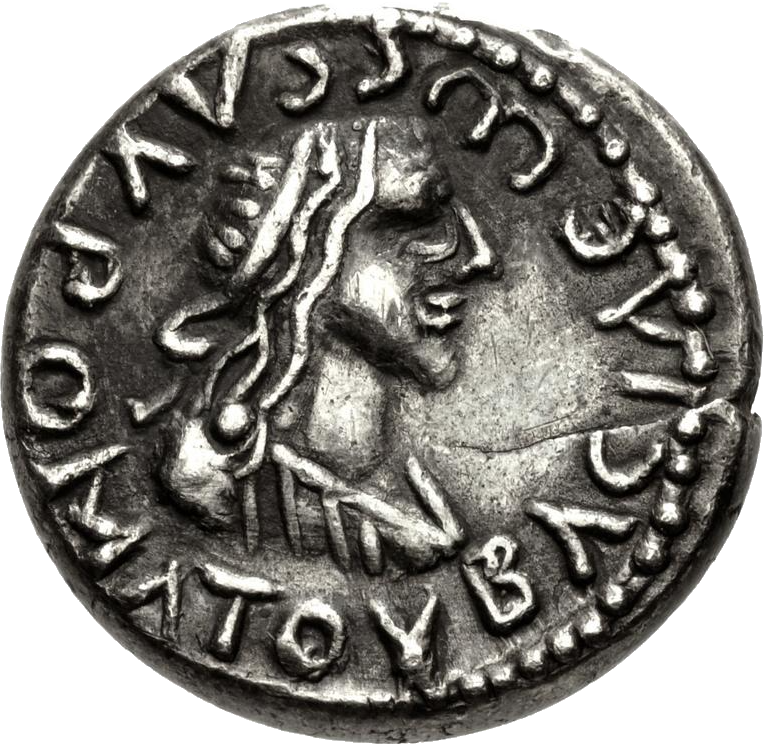
- Electrum stater of the Bosporan king Sauromates III. Obv.: head of Savromates III, legend: ΒΑCΙΛΕΩC CΑΥΡΟΜΑΤΟΥ. (Rev.: head of Severus ALexander, year ΦΚΖ΄ = 527 = 230/1.) 19 mm, 7,58 g.

King of the Bosporus
- Reign: 229–232
- Predecessor: T. J. Cotys III
- Successor: T. J. Cotys III; T. J. Rhescuporis IV
- Co-regents: T. J. Cotys III
- Died: 232
- Issue: T. J. Rhescuporis V T. J. Teiranes
- Dynasty: Tiberian-Julian
- Father: T. J. Rhescuporis III

Sauromates III (Greek: Τιβέριος Ἰούλιος Σαυροματης Γ'; fl. 3rd century – 232) was a Roman client king of the Bosporan Kingdom. Like many other late Bosporan kings, Sauromates III is known only from coinage, which means his relationship to the other kings is unknown, as are details of his accession and reign. His coins are known from the period 229–232, meaning that he appears to have co-ruled with Cotys III (r. 228–234), who might have been his father.

== See also ==
- Bosporan Kingdom
- Roman Crimea

Preceded by Cotys III	King of the Bosporus; 229-232 (with Cotys III)	Succeeded by Cotys III and Rhescoporis IV
