= Gordas =

Gordas (r. c. 503 – 528), also known as Grod, was a prince of the Crimean Huns.

He was a ruler of the Huns near the Maeotis, near the Cimmerian Bosporus. In 527 he went to Constantinople, where he received baptism. He then returned to his people and started to destroy their idols. This caused a revolt, led by his brother, in which he was killed. His murderers then fled, fearing Byzantine reprisals.
