= Tiberius Julius Cotys III =

King of Roman client state Bosporus from 228 to 234

T. J. Cotys III
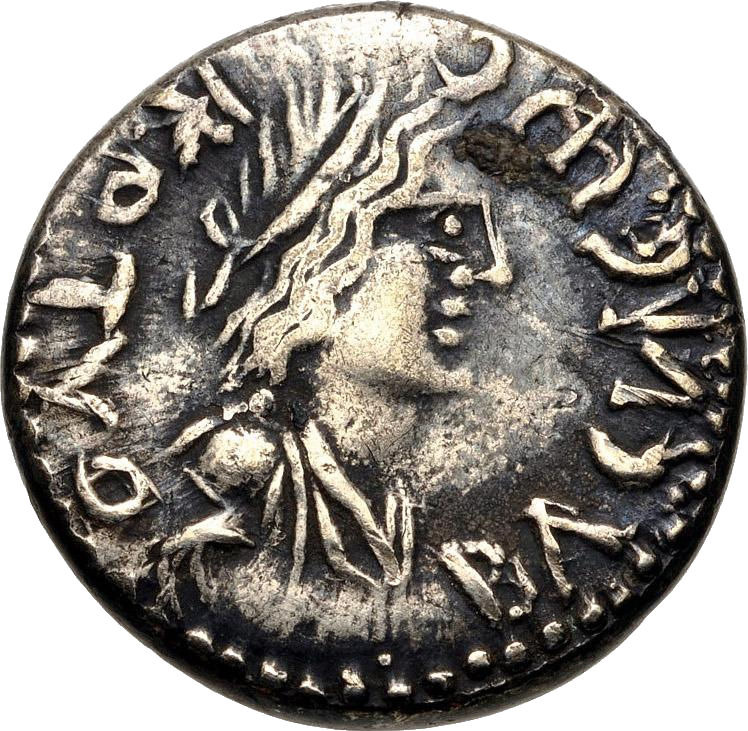
- Elecrum stater of Cotys III, legend: BACYΛEΩC ΚΟΤΥΟ. (other side: head of Severus Alexander, year ΦΚΕ' = 525 = 228/9) 18.5 mm, 7.38 g.

King of the Bosporus
- Reign: 228 - 234
- Predecessor: T. J. Rhescuporis III
- Successor: T. J. Ininthimeus
- Co-regent: T. J. Sauromates III 229-232; T. J. Rhescuporis IV 233-234
- Died: 234
- Issue: T. J. Rhescuporis IV; T. J. Ininthimeus
- Dynasty: Tiberian-Julian
- Father: T. J. Rhescuporis III

Cotys III or Kotys III (Greek: Τιβέριος Ἰούλιος Κότυς Γ' Φιλοκαῖσαρ Φιλορωμαῖος Eὐσεβής, Tiberios Iulios Kotys Philocaesar Philoromaios Eusebes; fl. Late 2nd century – 234) was a Roman client king of the Bosporan Kingdom.

Like many of the other late Bosporan kings, Cotys III is known mainly from coinage, meaning that the historical events of his reign are largely unknown. His coins are known from the period 228–234. He is known from an inscription to have been the son of his predecessor, Rhescuporis III.

Cotys III's coinage overlaps with the coins of Sauromates III, perhaps his brother, and Rhescuporis IV. They might thus have been co-rulers with him. His relationship to later kings is unknown, though it has been suggested that he was the father of Ininthimeus.

== See also ==
- Bosporan Kingdom
- Roman Crimea

Preceded by Rhescuporis III	King of the Bosporus; 228-234 (with Sauromates III 229-232) (with Rhescuporis IV 233-234)	Succeeded by Ininthimeus
