= Bosporan Kingdom =

Greco-Scythian state near Sea of Azov (c. 438 BC–c. AD 527)

Coordinates: 45°15′36″N 37°02′24″E

Kingdom of the Cimmerian Bosporus Βασίλειον τοῦ Κιμμερικοῦ Βοσπόρου
- c. 438 BC – c. AD 527
- Map showing the early growth of the Bosporan Kingdom, before its annexation by Mithridates VI of Pontus.
- Status: Independent kingdom (c. 480 – c. 107 BC); Kingdom of Pontus (107 – 63 BC); Client kingdom of the Roman Republic and Roman Empire (63 BC – AD 63; AD 68 – AD 527); Part of the Roman province of Moesia Inferior (AD 63 – AD 68)
- Capital: Panticapaeum
- Common languages: Greek; Scythian
- Religion: Local variant of Hellenistic polytheism
- Government: Monarchy
- King
  - 438–433 BC: Spartokos I (first, confirmed king)
  - AD 314–341: Rhescuporis VI (probably last leader)
- Historical era: Antiquity
  - Established: c. 438 BC
  - Disestablished: c. AD 527
- Currency: Pontic stater; Roman coinage
Preceded by
Greek city states
Succeeded by
Huns
Greuthungi
Byzantine Empire
Old Great Bulgaria
- Today part of: Russia; Ukraine (disputed) (Note: Since the 2014 Russian annexation of Crimea the status of the Crimea and of the city of Sevastopol is under dispute between Russia and Ukraine; Ukraine and the majority of the international community considers the Crimea and Sevastopol an integral part of Ukraine, while Russia, on the other hand, considers (and administrators) the Crimea and Sevastopol an integral part of Russia.)

The Bosporan Kingdom, also known as the Kingdom of the Cimmerian Bosporus (Ancient Greek: Βασιλεία τοῦ Κιμμερικοῦ Βοσπόρου, romanized: Basileía tou Kimmerikou Bospórou; Latin: Regnum Bospori), was an ancient Greco-Scythian state located in eastern Crimea and the Taman Peninsula on the shores of the Cimmerian Bosporus, centered in the present-day Strait of Kerch. It was the first truly 'Hellenistic' state, in the sense that a mixed population adopted the Greek language and civilization, under aristocratic consolidated leadership. Under the Spartocid dynasty, the aristocracy of the kingdom adopted a double nature of presenting themselves as archons to Greek subjects and as kings to barbarians, which some historians consider unique in ancient history. The Bosporan Kingdom became the longest surviving Roman client kingdom. The 1st and 2nd centuries AD saw a period of a new golden age of the Bosporan state. It was briefly incorporated as part of the Roman province of Moesia Inferior from AD 63 to 68 under Emperor Nero, before being restored as a Roman client kingdom. At the end of the 2nd century AD, King Sauromates II inflicted a critical defeat on the Scythians and included all the territories of the Crimean Peninsula in the structure of his state.

The prosperity of the Bosporan Kingdom was based on the export of wheat, fish and slaves. As a result, the Kingdom became the economic center of the Black Sea and is often dubbed the ancient Jewel of the Black Sea. The profit of the trade supported a class whose conspicuous wealth is still visible from newly discovered archaeological finds, excavated, often illegally, from numerous burial barrows known as kurgans. The once-thriving cities of the Bosporus left extensive architectural and sculptural remains, while the kurgans continue to yield spectacular Greco-Sarmatian objects, the best examples of which are now preserved in the Hermitage Museum in St. Petersburg. These include gold work, vases imported from Athens, coarse terracottas, textile fragments, and specimens of carpentry and marquetry.

== Early Greek colonies ==
Pantikapeon and other ancient Greek colonies along the north coast of the Black Sea, along with their modern names

The whole area was dotted with Greek cities: in the west, Panticapaeum (Kerch)—the most significant city in the region, Nymphaeum and Myrmekion; on the east Phanagoria (the second city of the region), Kepoi, Hermonassa, Portus Sindicus and Gorgippia.

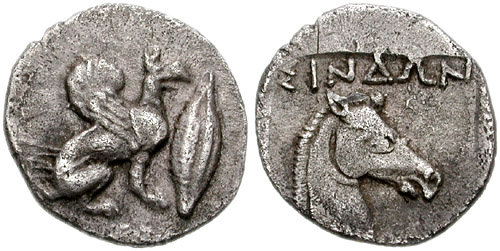
Circa 400 BC. Silver Diobol coin from the kingdom of Sindica (13mm, 1.03 gm, 3h), which became a part of the Bosporan Kingdom. Griffin seated right; barley grain before / ΣΙΝΔΩΝ, horsehead right, all in incuse square.

These Greek colonies were originally settled by Milesians in the 7th and 6th centuries BC. Phanagoria (c. 540 BC) was a colony of Teos, and the foundation of Nymphaeum may have had a connection with Athens; at least it appears to have been a member of the Delian League in the 5th century.

== Geography ==
The Bosporan Kingdom was located between the Crimean and Taman peninsulas centered around the Kerch Strait, known in antiquity as the Cimmerian Bosporus, from which the kingdom's name is derived. To south sat the Black Sea, a crossroads connecting Southeast Europe to the west, the Eurasian steppes to the north, the Caucasus and Central Asia to the east, Asia Minor and Mesopotamia to the south, and Greece to the southwest. To the north is the Sea of Azov, sometimes considered part of the Black Sea, with shallow waters and abundant rivers flowing toward it.

Most of the kingdom fell in the Pontic-Caspian Steppe, a temperate grassland ideal for nomadic pastoralism. The south-eastern Crimean coastline is flanked by the Crimean Mountains, with the highest peak being Roman-Kosh at 1,545 meters (5,069 ft.). Towards the west, the mountains drop steeply to the Black Sea, while to the east, they slowly develop into a steppe landscape. The southwestern coast of the Taman Peninsula is bound by the Greater Caucasus half of the Caucasus Mountains.

== Economy ==
Greek colonization in the Black sea region dates back into the Greek Dark Ages, from which there is ample evidence of cultural and economic exchange as well as hostility between Greek and local populations, such as the Thracians, Dacians, and later Scythians.

Scythian expansion and unification in the fifth century BC led to many of these settlements being wiped out or turned into Scythian protectorates, as was the case in the city of Olbia. It has been suggested that this pressure allowed the Archeanactid dynasty to create the first Bosporan state, lasting from 480-438 BC, at which point it was overthrown by the Spartocid Dynasty, beginning a period of economic expansion.

The Black Sea Greeks before this period had dealt largely in goods like animals, slaves, furs, and fish, with grain playing a minor role. Stemming from conditions caused by the Peloponnesian War, the city of Athens had acquired a large demand for grain, and the strain on their empire meant they could do little about Spartocids attacking the city of Nymphaeum, on which they relied on for Black Sea trade. The Spartocids were willing to trade their grain with Athens in exchange for mainland goods and silver, which presumably furthered Athenian decline.

== Military ==
The Bosporan kingdom under the Spartocid kings was heavily influenced by the mixing of local Scythian and Greeks at all levels of society, particularly in the nobility. In an internal conflict between Satyrus II and his brother Eumelus, the royal Bosporan army was said to contain no more than 2,000 Greeks, and an equal number of Thracians fighting as mercenaries. The vast majority of the army was Scythian, with 10,000 cavalry and over 20,000 infantry reported. Eumelus, allied with the Sirace king Aripharnes, brought 20,000 Scythian cavalry and even more infantry.

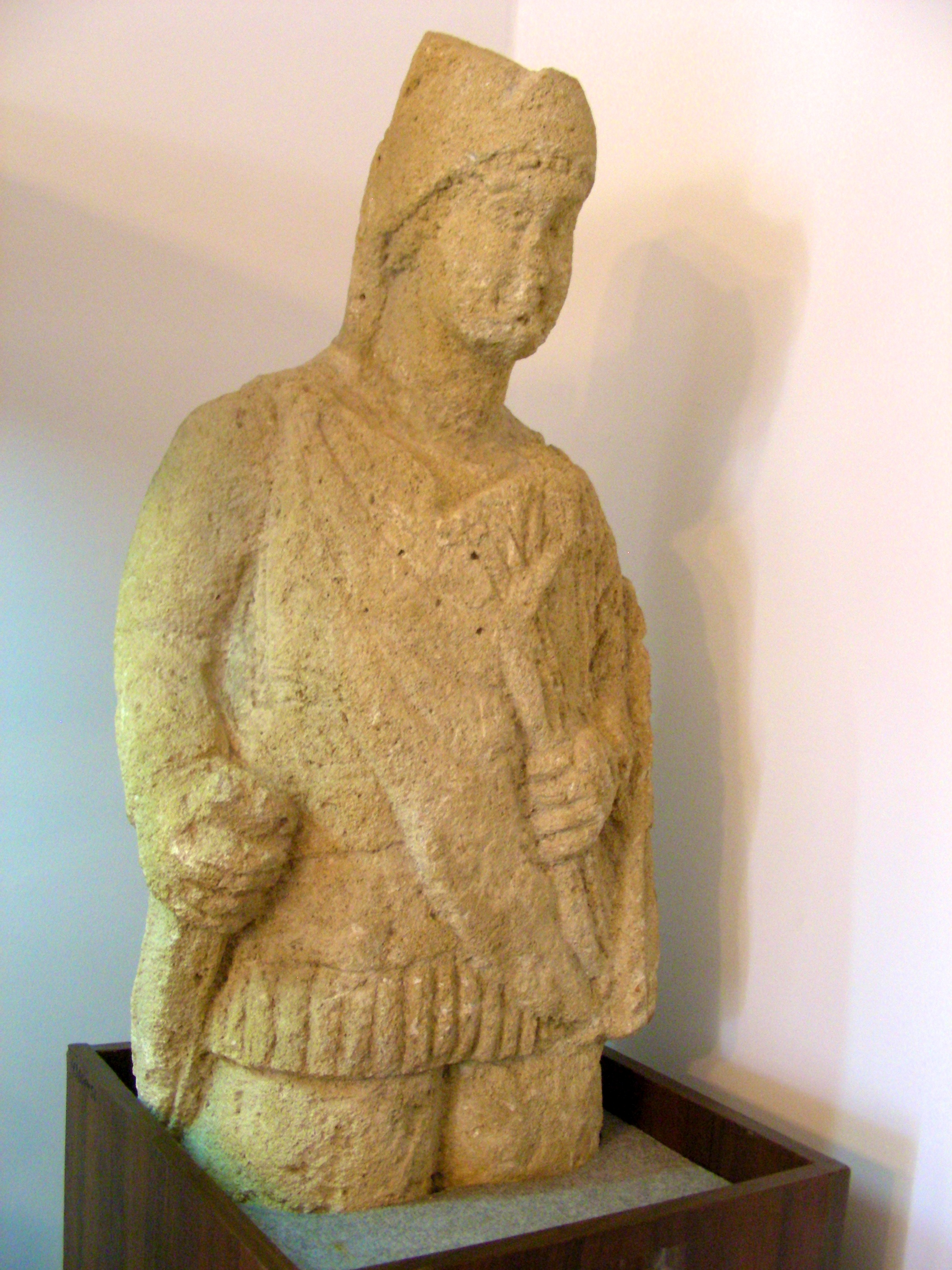
Sindi warrior typical of the levy troops found in both armies

== History ==
=== Hellenistic period ===
The northern Black Sea underwent what some historians refer to as a "long Hellenistic Age" due to the institutions typically associated with the era occurring independently from the greater Greek world. Their relatively isolated position, and constant contact/conflict with barbarians along their borders, allowed monarchs with traditions rooted in the region to establish independent kingdoms from those of the successor states.

=== Archaeanactidae dynasty ===
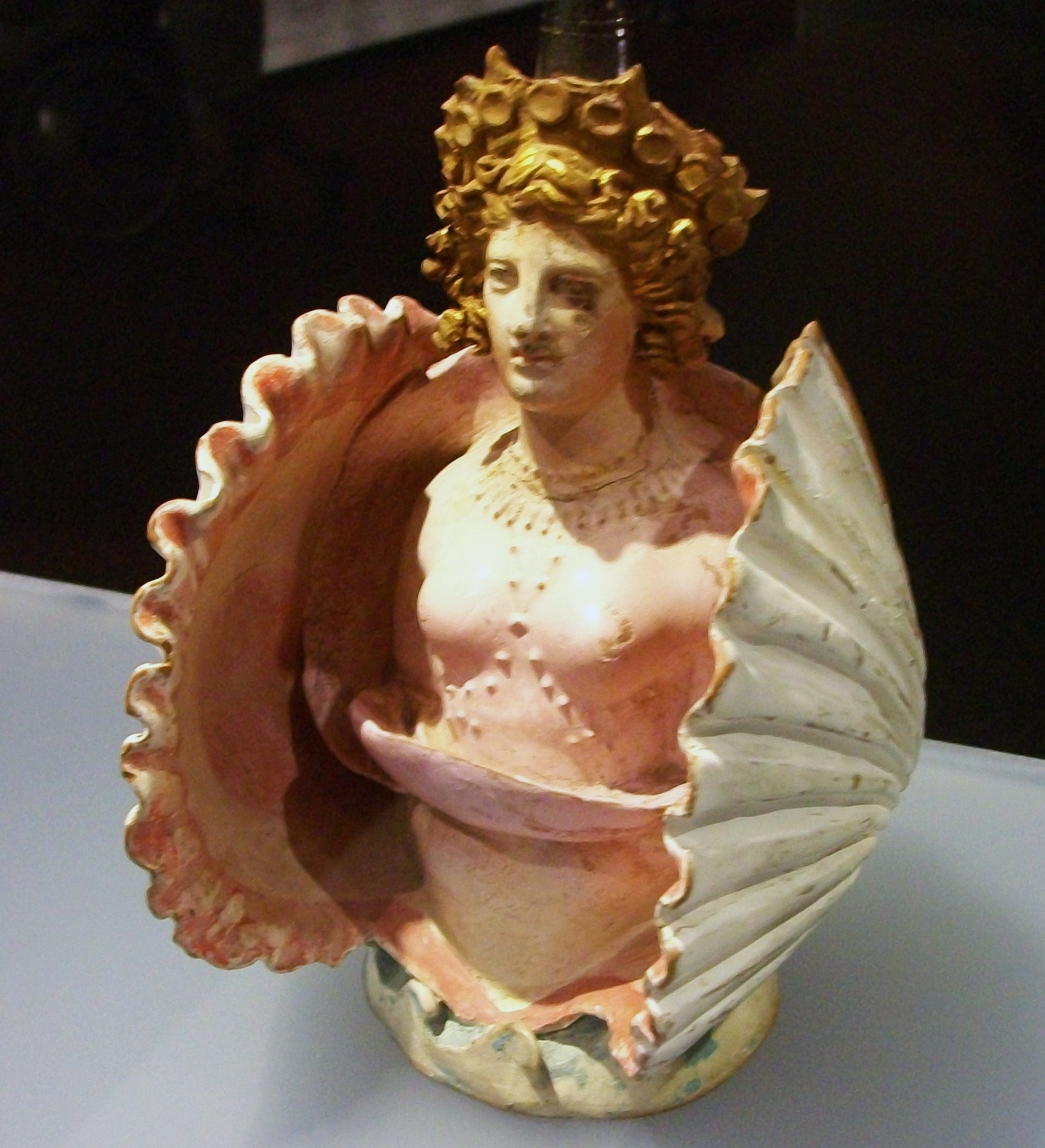
Pottery vessel in the shape of Aphrodite inside a shell; from Attica, Classical Greece, discovered in the Phanagoria cemetery, Taman Peninsula (Bosporan Kingdom, southern Russia), 1st quarter of 4th century BC, Hermitage Museum, Saint Petersburg.

According to Greek historian Diodorus Siculus (xii. 31) the region was governed between 480 and 438 BC by a line of kings called the Archaeanactidae, probably a ruling family, usurped by a tyrant called Spartocus (438–431 BC). While Spartocus was traditionally considered to be a Thracian due to the family name, more recent historians have posited he was likely of Greco-Scythian descent, as was typical of the region.

=== Spartocid dynasty ===
Spartocus founded a dynasty which seems to have endured until c. 110 BC, known as the Spartocids. The Spartocids left many inscriptions, indicating that the earliest members of the house ruled under the titles of archons of the Greek cities and kings of various minor native tribes, notably the Sindi (from central Crimea) and other branches of the Maeotae. Surviving material (texts, inscriptions and coins) do not supply enough information to reconstruct a complete chronology of kings of the region.

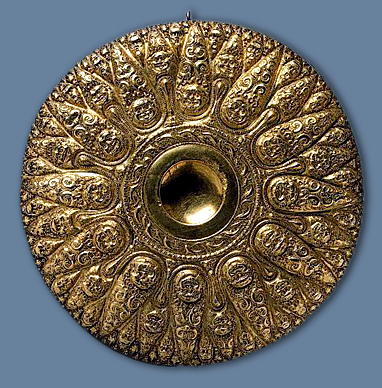
Bosporan Phiale (top view), 4th century BC

Satyrus (431–387 BC), successor to Spartocus, established his rule over the whole region, adding Nymphaeum to his kingdom and besieging Theodosia, which was wealthy because, unlike other cities in the region, it had a port which was free of ice throughout the year, allowing it to trade grain with the rest of the Greek world, even in winter. Satyrus' son Leucon (387–347 BC) eventually took the city. He was succeeded jointly by his two sons, Spartocus II, and Paerisades; Spartocus died in 342 BC, allowing Paerisades to reign alone until 310 BC. After Paerisades' death, a war of succession between his sons Satyrus and Eumelus was fought. Satyrus defeated his younger brother Eumelus at the Battle of the River Thatis in 310 BC but was then killed in battle, giving Eumelus the throne.

Eumelus' successor was Spartocus III (303–283 BC) and after him Paerisades II. Succeeding princes repeated the family names, so it is impossible to assign them a definite order. The last of them, however, Paerisades V, unable to make headway against increasingly violent attacks from nomadic tribes in the area, called in the help of Diophantus, general of King Mithridates VI of Pontus, leaving him his kingdom. Paerisades was killed by a Scythian named Saumacus who led a rebellion against him.

The Spartocids were well known as a line of enlightened and wise princes; although Greek opinion could not deny that they were, strictly speaking, tyrants, they are always described as dynasts. They maintained close relations with Athens, their best customer for the Bosporan grain exports: Leucon I of Bosporus created privileges for Athenian ships at Bosporan ports. The Attic orators make numerous references to this. In return the Athenians granted Leucon Athenian citizenship and made decrees in honour of him and his sons.

=== Mithridates VI ===
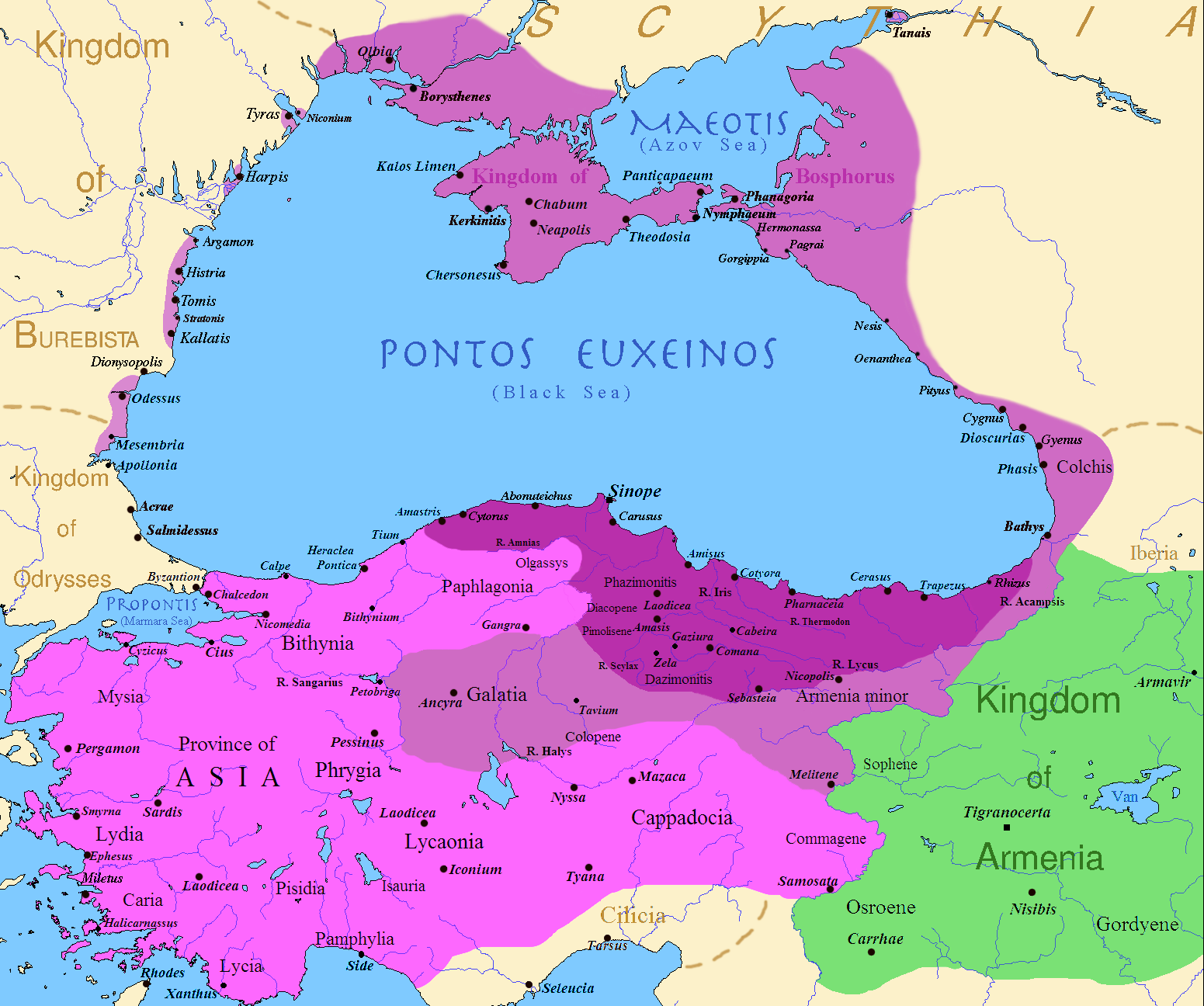
The northern Black sea shores of the Pontic Kingdom (actual Crimea and Kerch peninsula) shown as part of the empire of Mithridates VI of Pontus.

After his defeat by Roman General Pompey in 66 BC, King Mithridates VI of Pontus fled with a small army from Colchis (modern Georgia) over the Caucasus Mountains to Crimea and made plans to raise yet another army to take on the Romans. His eldest living son, Machares, regent of Cimmerian Bosporus, was unwilling to aid his father, so Mithridates had Machares killed, acquiring the throne for himself. Mithridates then ordered the conscriptions and preparations for war. In 63 BC, Pharnaces, the youngest son of Mithridates, led a rebellion against his father, joined by Roman exiles in the core of Mithridates's Pontic army. Mithridates VI withdrew to the citadel in Panticapaeum, where he committed suicide. Pompey buried Mithridates VI in a rock-cut tomb in either Sinope or Amasia, the capital of the Kingdom of Pontus.

=== Roman client kingdom ===
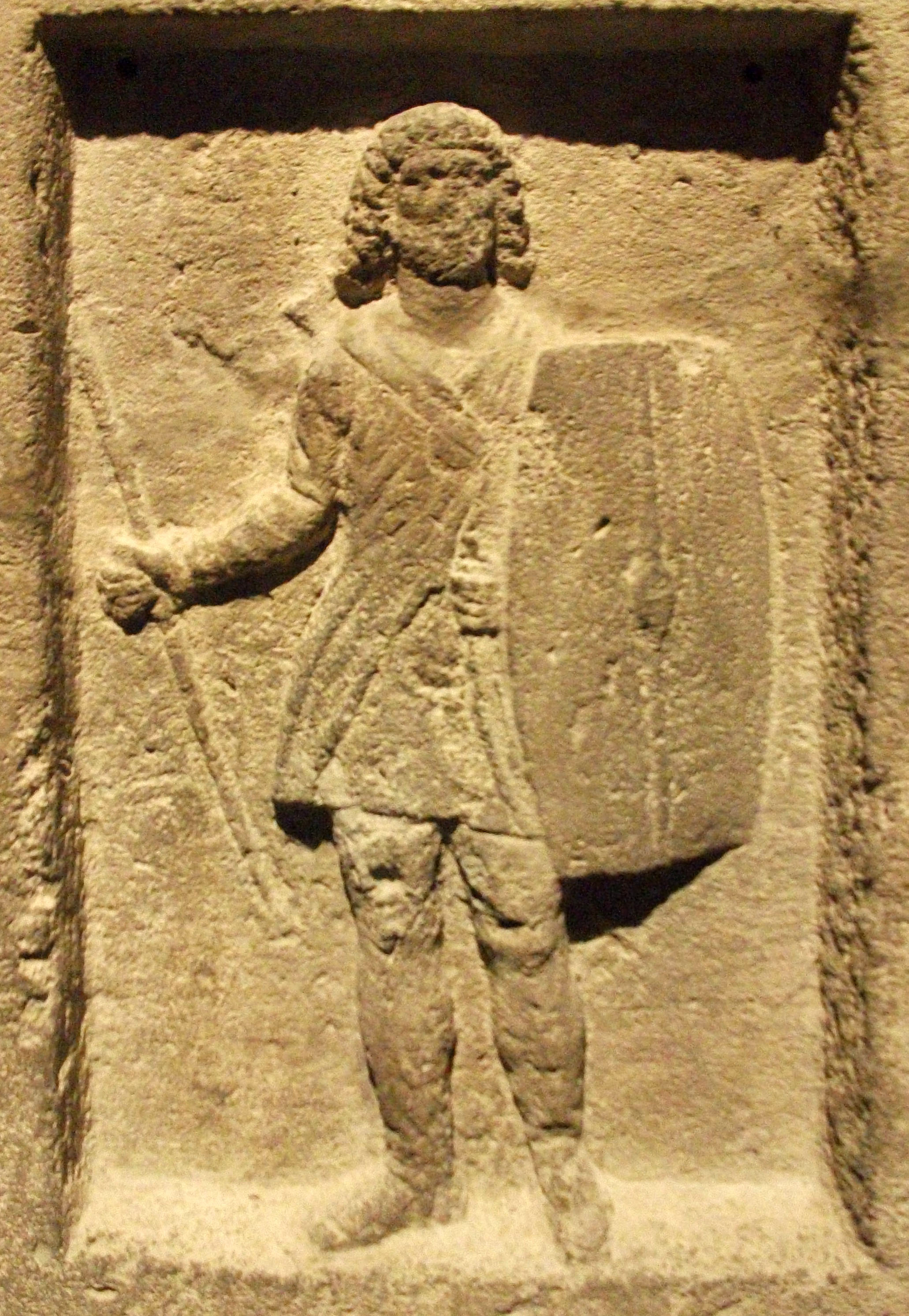
The stele of Staphhilos from Panticapaeum, depicting a soldier with the traditional Bosporan long hair and beard.

After the death of Mithridates VI (63 BC), Pharnaces II (63–47 BC) supplicated to Pompey, and then tried to regain his dominion during Julius Caesar's Civil War, but was defeated by Caesar at Zela and was later killed by his former governor and son-in-law Asander.

Before the death of Pharnaces II, Asander had married Pharnaces II's daughter Dynamis. Asander and Dynamis were the ruling monarchs until Caesar commanded a paternal uncle of Dynamis, Mithridates II to declare war on the Bosporan Kingdom and claimed the kingship for himself. Asander and Dynamis were defeated by Caesar's ally and went into political exile. However, after Caesar's death in 44 BC, the Bosporan Kingdom was restored to Asander and Dynamis by Caesar's great nephew and heir Octavian. Asander ruled as an archon and later as king until his death in 17 BC. After the death of Asander, Dynamis was compelled to marry a Roman usurper called Scribonius, but the Romans under Agrippa intervened and established Polemon I of Pontus (16–8 BC) in his place. Polemon married Dynamis in 16 BC and she died in 14 BC. Polemon ruled as king until his death in 8 BC. After the death of Polemon, Aspurgus, the son of Dynamis and Asander, succeeded Polemon.

The Bosporan Kingdom of Aspurgus was a client state of the Roman Empire, protected by Roman garrisons. Aspurgus (8 BC – AD 38) founded a dynasty of kings which endured with a couple of interruptions until AD 341. Aspurgus adopted the Roman name "Tiberius Julius" when he received Roman citizenship and enjoyed the patronage of the first two Roman Emperors, Augustus and Tiberius. All of the following kings adopted these two Roman names followed by a third name, of Thracian (Kotys, Rhescuporis or Rhoemetalces) or local origin (such as Sauromates, Eupator, Ininthimeus, Pharsanzes, Synges, Terianes, Theothorses or Rhadamsades).

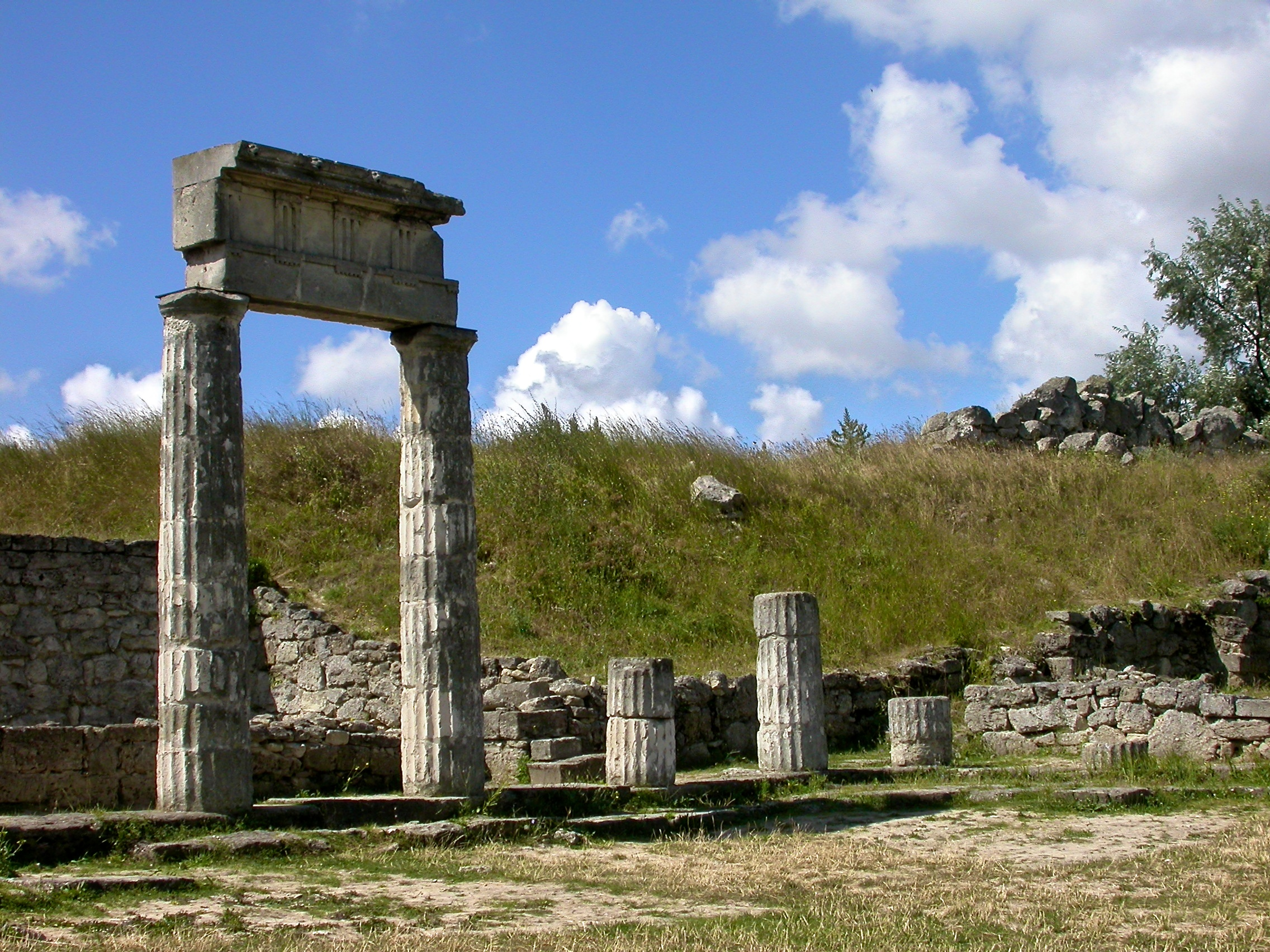
Ruins of Panticapaeum, modern Kerch, the capital of the Bosporan Kingdom.

The Roman client kings of the dynasty had descended from King Mithridates VI of Pontus and his first wife, his sister Laodice, through Aspurgus. The kings adopted a new calendar (the "Pontic era") introduced by Mithridates VI, starting with 297 BC to date their coins. Bosporan kings struck coinage throughout its period as a client state, which included gold staters bearing portraits of both the Roman emperor and Bosporan king. Like Roman coinage, Bosporan coinage became increasingly debased during the 3rd century. The coinage makes their lineages fairly clear to historians, though scarcely any events from their reigns are recorded.

The Bosporan Kingdom covered the eastern half of Crimea and the Taman Peninsula, and extended along the east coast of the Maeotian marshes to Tanais at the mouth of the Don in the north-east, a great market for trade with the interior. Throughout the period there was perpetual war with the native tribes of Scythians and Sarmatians, and in this the Bosporan Kingdom was supported by its Roman suzerains, who lent the assistance of garrisons and fleets.

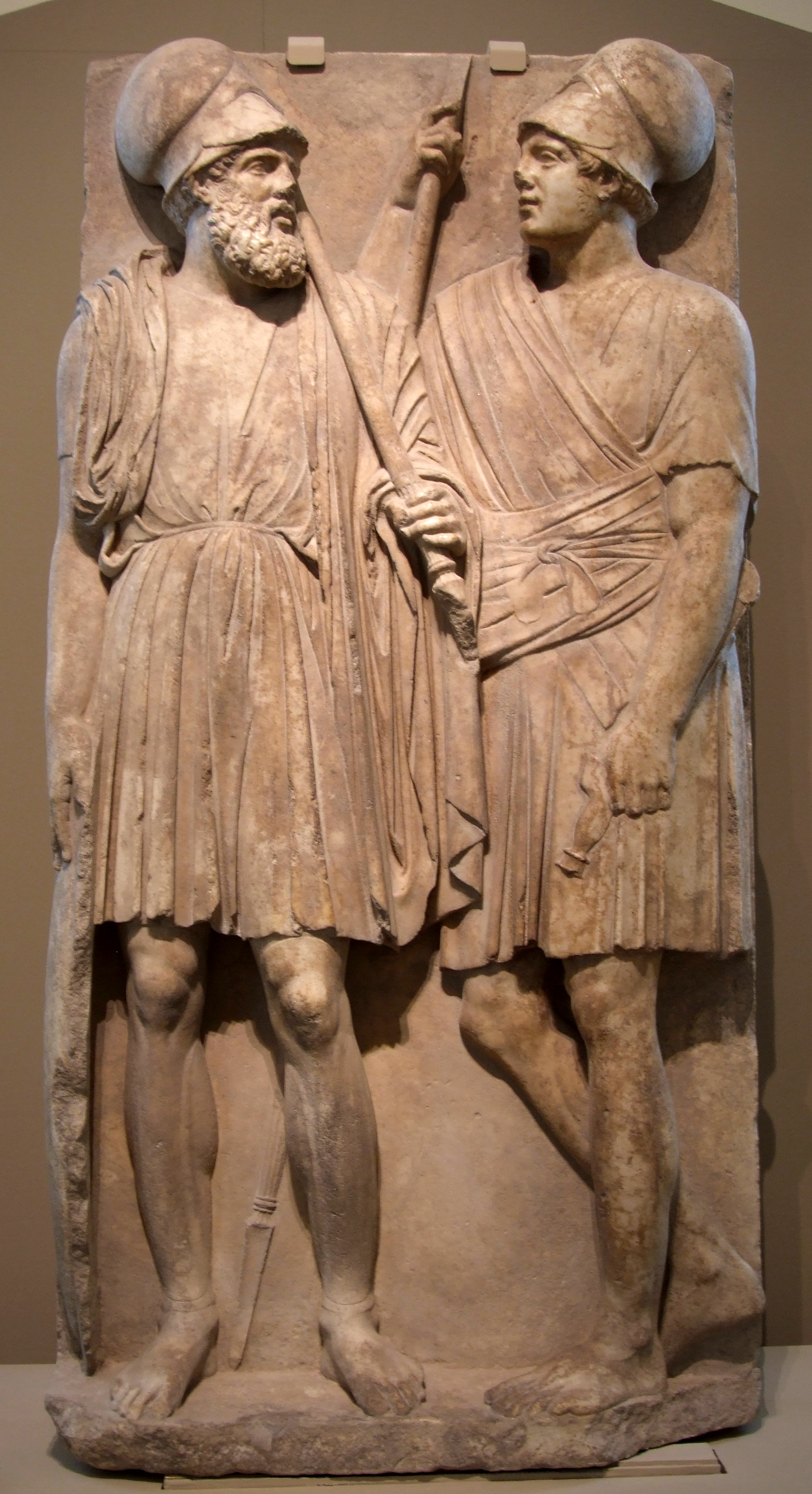
Stele with two Hellenistic soldiers of the Bosporan Kingdom; from Taman Peninsula (Yubileynoe), southern Russia, 3rd quarter of the 4th century BC; marble, Pushkin Museum

In AD 62 for reasons unknown, Roman emperor Nero deposed the Bosporan king Cotys I. It is possible that Nero wanted to minimize the power of local client rulers and wanted the Bosporans to be subsumed into the Roman Empire. The Bosporan Kingdom was incorporated as part of the Roman province of Moesia Inferior from 63 to 68. In 68, the new Roman emperor Galba restored the Bosporan Kingdom to Rhescuporis I, the son of Cotys I.

Following the Jewish diaspora, Judaism emerged in the region, and Jewish communities developed in some of the cities of the region (especially Tanais). The Jewish or Thracian influence on the region may have inspired the foundation of a cult to the "Most High God", a distinct regional cult which emerged in the 1st century AD, which professed monotheism without being distinctively Jewish or Christian.

The balance of power among the local tribes was severely disturbed by westward migration in the 3rd–4th centuries. In the 250s AD, the Goths and Borani were able to seize Bosporan shipping and even raid the shores of Anatolia.

=== Fate of the kingdom ===
There are no known coins from the Bosporan Kingdom after the last ones minted by Rhescuporis VI in 341, which makes constructing a chronology very difficult. Though the kingdom is traditionally believed to have been destroyed at the end of his reign by the Goths and the Huns, there is no concrete evidence for this. There is an inscription by a Bosporan ruler named Douptounos from c. 483, nearly a century and a half after Rhescuporis VI, which makes it unlikely that the kingdom and its line of kings came to an end in the mid-4th century. Additionally, archaeological data from the time indicate a period with a growing economy rather than societal collapse.

Because of evidence of their increasing prominence in the Crimea, it is possible that Rhescuporis was overthrown by a Sarmatian or Alan tribal leader, who established his own dynasty on the Bosporan throne. It is known that the Goths later held power in the Crimea, from c. 380 onwards, since a 404 letter to John Chrysostom, archbishop of Constantinople, refers to the local ruler as a rex Gothiorum ("king of the Goths"). The Gothic Bosporan realm likely became a vassal of the Hunnic Empire, regaining its independence after the empire's collapse in the 450s and 460s. The Byzantine historian Procopius describes the Goths of Crimea fighting against and then allying with the Utigurs, indicating that Gothic control of the region lasted for some time after the departure of the Huns. Despite the waves of barbarian domination, the late Bosporus remained an ancient Hellenistic state in language, culture and traditions; the local material culture from the third to sixth centuries is distinguished both by its great complexity and by syncretism, intertwining both ancient and new barbarian elements.

Through some means, the Goths appear to have left or been driven away, leading to the resumption of local self-rule in the late 5th century under rulers such as Douptounos, who re-oriented the kingdom towards the Byzantine Empire as a client state. Such a re-orientation is also evidenced by the presence of Byzantine coins in the Crimea, including coinage of emperors Justin I (r. 518–527) and Justinian I (r. 527–565). By Justinian's time, the Bosporus was under a barbarian ruler once more: the Hunnic ruler Gordas. Though Gordas maintained good relations with Justinian, he was killed in a revolt in 527, which led the emperor to send armies to the Bosporus, conquering the lands of the kingdom and establishing imperial control there.

The Bosporan cities enjoyed a revival, under Byzantine and Bulgarian protection. The ancient Greek city of Phanagoria became the capital of Old Great Bulgaria between 632 and 665. The town of Tmutarakan, on the eastern side of the strait, became the seat of the principality of Tmutarakan within Kievan Rus' in the 10th and 11th centuries, which in turn gave way to Tatar domination. From time to time Byzantine Greek officers built fortresses and exercised authority at Bosporus, which constituted an archbishopric. A relevant Byzantine usage of the term is found in a newly discovered seal of a general of the early 11th century as of "Πο⟨σ⟩φορ(ου)", i.e., of the Cimmerian Bosporos. Also, in the early 12th century reference is made of the Byzantine Empire's reassertion of control over the Cimmerian Bosporos (Κιμμέριον Βόσπορον).

== Coinage ==
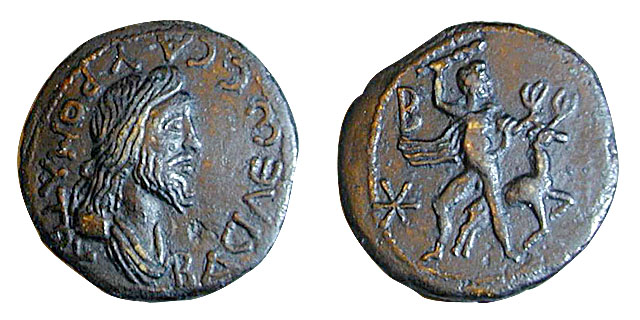
Bronze coin of Sauromates II, c. 172–211 AD. Legend: BACΙΛΕΩC CΑΥΡΟΜΑΤΟΥ.

Although considered rare among collectors prior to the demise of the Soviet Union in 1991, Bosporan coins are now well known on the international coin markets, hinting at the quantities produced. Several large series were produced by Bosporan cities from the 5th century BC, particularly in Panticapaeum. Gold staters of Panticapaeum bearing Pan's head and a griffin are especially remarkable for their weight and fine workmanship.

There are coins with the names of the later Spartocids and a complete series of dated solidi issued by the later or Achaemenian dynasty. In them may be noticed the swift degeneration of the gold solidus through silver and potin to bronze.

== See also ==
- Cimmerians
- Strait of Kerch
- Getae
- Kingdom of Pontus
- Odrysian kingdom
- Tanais Tablets
