= Cotys =

Cotys may refer to:

== People ==
- Cotys I (disambiguation), multiple people
- Cotys II (disambiguation), multiple people
- Cotys III (disambiguation), multiple people
- Cotys IV, Odrysian king of Thrace
- Cotys V, Odrysian king of Thrace
- Cotys VI, King of Thrace
- Cotys VII, King of Thrace
- Cotys VIII, King of Thrace
- Cotys IX, son to Cotys VIII and Roman Client King of Lesser Armenia
- Tiberius Julius Cotys I (fl. 1st century), second grandson to Cotys VIII and King of the Bosporan Kingdom
- Tiberius Julius Cotys II (fl. 2nd century), King of the Bosporan Kingdom
- Tiberius Julius Cotys III (died 235), King of the Bosporan Kingdom

== Mythology ==
- Cotys, mythical king of Lydia in Greek mythology.

== Other uses ==
- Cotys (insect), a genus of groundhopper in the subfamily Tetriginae

== See also ==
- Kotys
- Kotys (surname)
- Coty (disambiguation)
