= Sapaeans =

Thracian tribe based close to the Greek city of Abdera

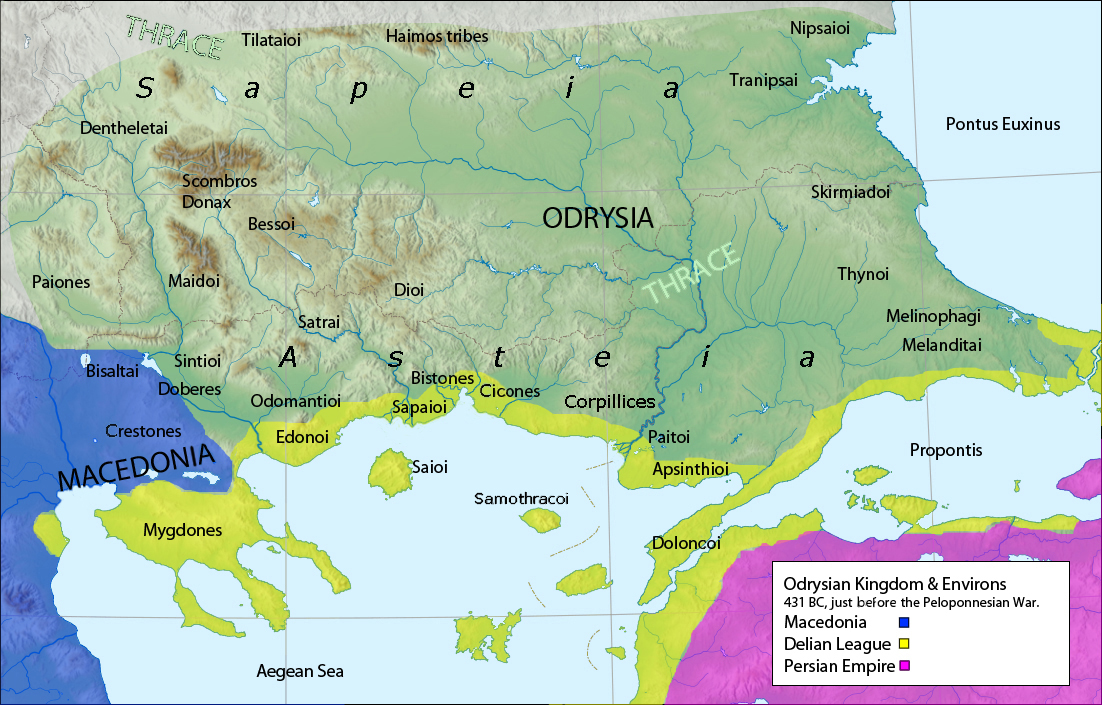
Approximate location of the Sapaioi

Sapaeans, Sapaei or Sapaioi (Ancient Greek, "Σαπαῖοι") were a Thracian tribe close to the Greek city of Abdera. One of their kings was named Abrupolis and had allied himself with the Romans. They ruled Thrace after the Odrysians until its incorporation by the Roman Empire as a province.

== Sapaean Kings of Thrace ==
- Cotys I son of Rhoemetalces c. 57 BC – c. 48 BC
- Rhescuporis I son of Cotys I 48 BC-41 BC
- Cotys II son of Rhescuporis I 42 BC – 15 BC

- Thrace becomes a client state of Rome at 11 BC

- Rhoemetalces I son of Cotys II 15 BC – 12 AD
- Rhescuporis II son of Cotys II in western Thrace; 12–18 AD deposed
- Cotys III son of Rhoemetalces I in eastern Thrace 12–18 murdered
- Rhoemetalces II son of Cotys III and Tryphaena 18–26

- Roman caretaker rules Rhoemetalces III part of Thrace 26-38

- Antonia Tryphaena (Queen), co-ruler of Rhoemetalces II
- Rhoemetalces III son of Rhescuporis II 38–46

- 46 to the Roman Empire

- Pythodoris II (Queen), co-ruler of Rhoemetalces III

== Family tree of Sapaean kings of Thrace ==
Rhoemetalces; SAPAEAN KINGS
Cotys I (Sapaean)
Mark Antony ∞ Antonia Hybrida	Rhescuporis I (Sapaean)	Rascus
Antonia ∞ Pythodoros of Tralles	Cotys II (Sapaean)
Pythodorida of Pontus ∞ Polemon I of Pontus	Rhoemetalces I ∞ Pythodoris I	(woman) ∞ Cotys VII; ASTAEAN KINGS	Rhescuporis II (Sapaean)
Antonia Tryphaena	Cotys III (Sapaean)	Rhoemetalces III; 38-46
Rhoemetalces II; 19-38	Gepaepyris ∞ Tiberius Julius Aspurgus king of Vosporus	Cotys IX king of Lesser Armenia	Pythodoris II

== See also ==
- List of Thracian tribes
