= Asti (Thracian tribe) =

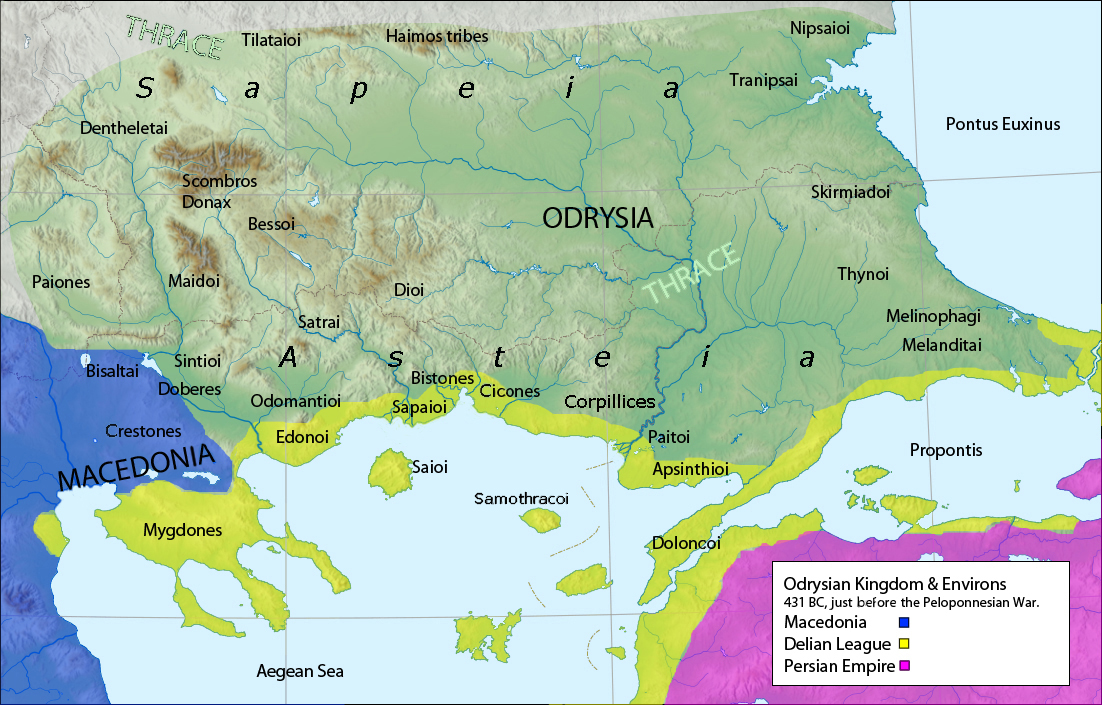
Temporary area of some tribes including Astae and Sapei

Asti (Greek: Αστοί) is the name of a Thracian tribe which is mentioned by Livy. It is believed that they lived around the old Thracian capital of Bizye.

== List of rulers ==
A possible continuation of the earlier Odrysian monarchy under a line of kings reigning from Bizye (now Vize) in eastern Thrace.

- Cotys V, son of ? Beithys (?-by 87 BC)
- Sadalas I, son of Cotys V (by 87–after 79 BC)
  - Amadocus, Odrysian royal sent to the aid of Sulla at Chaeronea in 86 BC
- Cotys VI, son of Sadalas I (by 57–48 BC)
- Sadalas II, son of Cotys VI (48–42 BC)
- Sadalas III, kinsman of Sadalas II (42-31 BC)
- Cotys VII, son of Sadalas II by Polemocratia (31–18 BC)
- Rhescuporis II, son of Cotys VII by daughter of the Sapaean king Cotys II, killed by the Bessi (18–11 BC)
  - 11 BC Astaean Thrace conferred on Rhescuporis II's maternal uncle, the Sapaean king Rhoemetalces I, by the Roman emperor Augustus, thereby uniting Thrace

== Family tree of Astaean kings in Thrace ==
Cotys IV in inner Thrace; ODRYSIAN KINGS
Dyegilos king of Caeni	Bithys in inner Thrace; BRANCH OF; ASTAEAN KINGS
Cotys V
Sadalas I
Cotys VI
Sadalas II
Sadalas III	Cotys VII	(woman)	Rhoemetalces I king of Sapaeans
Rhescuporis II (Astaean)	SAPAEAN KINGS

== See also ==
- List of Thracian tribes
