= Rhescuporis =

Rhescuporis (also Rascypolis, Rhascoupolis, Rhascupolis) may refer to:

== Kings of Thrace ==
- Rhescuporis I, Odrysian King of Thrace, 240 to 215 BC
- Rhescuporis I, Sapaean King of Thrace, 48 to 41 BC
- Rhescuporis II, Odrysian-Astaean King of Thrace, 18 BC to 13 BC
- Rhescuporis II, Sapaean King of Thrace, 12 to 18

== Roman Client Kings of the Bosporan Kingdom ==
- Rhescuporis I, ruled from 14 until 42
- Rhescuporis II, ruled from 78 until 93
- Rhescuporis III, ruled from 211 until 218
- Rhescuporis IV, ruled from 233 until 234
- Rhescuporis V, ruled from 240 until 276
- Rhescuporis VI, ruled from 314 until 341
