= Koty =

Koty may refer to:

== Places ==
- Koty, Pisz County (former village in north-east Poland)
- Koty, Podlaskie Voivodeship (north-east Poland)
- Koty, Silesian Voivodeship (south Poland)
- Koty, Warmian-Masurian Voivodeship (north Poland)
- Koty, Yavoriv Raion, Lviv Oblast, Ukraine

== People ==
- Abbas Koty (1952–1993) Chadian politician

== Other uses ==
- KOTY (Texas), a defunct radio station (95.7 FM) formerly licensed to serve Mason, Texas, United States

== See also ==
- Koty-Rybno, Gmina Grajewo, Grajewo, Podlaskie, Poland
- Coty (disambiguation)
- Kotys (surname)
- Kotys
