= Sapaean kingdom =

Ancient Thracian state in the southeastern Balkans

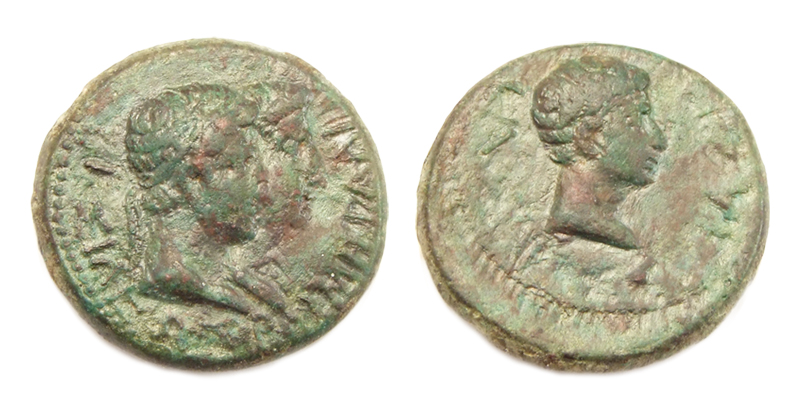
Coin of Rhoemetalces I (r. 11 BC–12 AD). The obverse shows Rhoemetalces and his wife Pythodoris, the reverse Emperor Augustus.

The Thracian kingdom, also called the Sapaean kingdom, was an ancient Thracian state in the southeastern Balkans that existed from the middle of the 1st century BC to 46 AD. Succeeding the Classical and Hellenistic era Odrysian kingdom of Thrace, it was dominated by the Sapaean tribe, who ruled from their capital Bizye in what is now northwestern Turkey. Initially only of limited relevance, its power grew significantly in the ancient Roman world as a client state of the late Roman Republic. After the Battle of Actium in 31 BC, Octavian (later emperor Augustus) installed a new dynasty that proved to be highly loyal and expansive. Conquering and ruling much of Thrace on behalf of the Roman Empire, it lasted until 46 AD, when Emperor Claudius annexed the kingdom and made Thracia into a Roman province.

== History ==
In the late 2nd and early 1st century BC, Thrace was politically fractured and subject to constant fighting between local and foreign powers. As a result of a paucity of sources for this period, the status and background of various little-known local monarchs remains disputed among historians. At least some of the Thracian kings of this period probably belonged to the Thracian tribe of the Sapaeans. At the same time, the Roman Republic tried to exert more influence in the region, though Roman relations with the Thracians remained inconsistent and dependent on the interests of individual Roman officials. The Romans encountered great resistance and suffered repeated defeats at the hands of Thracian tribes, most importantly the Bessi; regardless, the Romans gradually contained Thracian raiding into surrounding, Roman-dominated areas like the one of ancient Macedon. The Romans were generally interested in centralizing the disorganized Thracian territories, hoping that local monarchs could then act as intermediaries and reduce the chaos at the Roman borders.

By the middle of the 1st century BC, the Sapaeans had emerged as one of the most important Thracian tribes; the latter eventually became Rome's allies and clients. Despite this, the Romans initially favored a local kingdom led by an Odrysian-Astaean royal family. Probably soon after the Battle of Actium in 31 BC, Roman leader Augustus sought to implement indirect rule over Thrace through a large, Hellenized client kingdom. The Romans removed the Odrysian-Astaean royal family from power, and put the entire kingdom under Sapaean rule with Bizye acting as the initial center of this reorganized polity. However, many Thracians continued to oppose both the Sapaeans as well as the Romans. Around 13 BC, the Bessi under a priest named Vologaesus revolted and killed the Thracian king. The Roman Empire put down the rebellion and consequently expanded its holdings along the Danube. Another unsuccessful revolt broke out in 11 BC.

The power of the Thracian kingdom declined as the royal family became embroiled in dynastic conflicts and civil wars. When Sapaean ruler Rhoemetalces I died in 12 AD, the Romans divided his kingdom among his son Cotys III and his brother Rhescuporis II, but the two rulers quickly started to fight each other. Cotys III was murdered by his uncle in 19 AD, whereupon the Romans deposed him and picked new kings from the two lines. Further rebellions continued to erupt in the Thracian kingdom, such as in 21 AD when insurgents besieged king Rhoemetalces II. He was saved by the Roman army's intervention. In turn, Rhoemetalces II helped the Romans to put down a rebellion among the southern Thracian mountain tribes in 26 AD. Around 44/45 AD, another revolt broke out during which king Rhoemetalces III was killed. In 46 AD, Roman Emperor Claudius put an end to the kingdom by annexing it.

== List of Sapaean kings ==
- Cotys I (57–48 BC)
- Rhescuporis I (48–41 BC)
- Cotys II (42–15 BC)
- Rhoemetalces I, son of Rhescuporis I (15 BC–12 AD)
- Cotys III, son of Rhoemetalces I and rule of the kingdom's eastern portion (12–18 AD)
- Rhescuporis II, younger brother of Rhoemetalces I and rule of the kingdom's western portion (12–19 AD)
- Antonia Tryphaena, mother and co-ruler of Rhoemetalces II (19–38 AD)
- Rhoemetalces II, son of Cotys III (19–38 AD)
- Rhoemetalces III, son of Rhescuporis (38–46 AD)
- Pythodoris II, sister of Rhoemetalces II and co-ruler of Rhoemetalces III (38–46 AD)
