= Sadalas =

Sadalas is the name of three kings of the Odrysian kingdom of Thrace.

- Sadalas I, reigned before 87 BCE to after 79 BCE
- Sadalas II, reigned 48 BCE – 42 BCE
- Sadalas III, reigned 42 BCE – 31 BCE, possibly the son of Sadalas II
