= Baptae =

Baptae (Ancient Greek: Βαπταί) may refer to:

- The priests of Cotyttia, the festival of Cotytto, the Greek goddess of lewdness, see Baptes
- a comedy of the ancient Greek writer Eupolis in which he assailed the effeminacy and debauchery of his countrymen
