= Bithyas =

Bithyas may refer to:

- Beithys, king of the Odrysian kingdom of Thrace
- Bithyas River, a river of ancient Thrace
