= Rhescuporis II =

Rhescuporis II may refer to:

- Rhescuporis II (Odrysian), Odrysian King of Thrace, 18–13 BC
- Rhescuporis II (Sapaean), Sapean King of Thrace, AD 12-19
- Either of two kings of the Cimmerian Bosporus:
  - Tiberius Julius Rhescuporis I, also called Rhescuporis II, reigned AD 68–93
  - Rhescuporis III, also called Rhescuporis II, reigned AD 211–228

== See also ==
- Rhescuporis I (disambiguation)
