= Latinia gens =

Ancient Roman family

The gens Latinia was a minor family at ancient Rome, which flourished during Imperial times.

== Origin ==
The nomen Latinius seems to imply that the ancestors of the gens were Latins, and perhaps were once known by the surname of Latinus, designating them as such. But one of the earliest records of the family is an inscription on an Etruscan cinerary urn, dating from the third century BC, which reads, AV·LATINI·VELSIAL, that is, "Aulus Latinius, son of Velsia". So the name may originally have been applied to an Etruscan family of Latin origin.

== Members ==
This list includes abbreviated praenomina. For an explanation of this practice, see filiation.

- Aulus Latinius Velsial natus, from an Etruscan cinerary urn, dating to the third century BC.
- Latinius Pandusa, propraetor of Moesia during the reign of Tiberius, was sent to Thrace to secure the release of Cotys, the Thracian king, from his uncle, Rhescuporis, in AD 19. He died in Moesia later that year.
- Latinius Latiaris, a disciple of Sejanus, was praetor in an uncertain year during the reign of Tiberius. He denounced Titius Sabinus, an eques who had been a friend of Germanicus, and who was put to death through Latinius' conniving. He was condemned and executed after the fall of Sejanus.
- Lucius Latinius L. f. Macer, centurion primi pili and praefectus castrorum of the Legio IX Hispana in the early second century AD. He dedicated an altar to Apollo at Aquae Grani.
- Marcus Cassianius Latinius Postumus, a usurper, whose dominion over Gaul, Spain, Britain, and Germania from AD 260 to 269 is widely known as the Gallic Empire.
- Latinius Pacatus Drepanius, a panegyrist of the late fourth century AD.

== See also ==
- List of Roman gentes

== Bibliography ==
- Publius Cornelius Tacitus, Annales.
- Trebellius Pollio, Triginta Tyranni (The Thirty Tyrants).
- Eutropius, Breviarium Historiae Romanae (Abridgement of the History of Rome).
- Sextus Aurelius Victor, De Caesaribus (On the Caesars).
- Sextus Aurelius Victor (attributed), Epitome de Caesaribus.
- Paulus Orosius, Historiarum Adversum Paganos (History Against the Pagans).
- Zosimus, Historia Nova (New History).
- Joannes Zonaras, Epitome Historiarum (Epitome of History).
- Dictionary of Greek and Roman Biography and Mythology, William Smith, ed., Little, Brown and Company, Boston (1849).
- René Cagnat et alii, L'Année épigraphique (The Year in Epigraphy, abbreviated “AE”), Presses Universitaires de France (1888–present).
