= Cotys IX =

1st century AD Thracian prince and Roman Client King of Lesser Armenia

Cotys IX or Kotys IX (Greek: Κότυς, flourished 1st century) was a Thracian prince and the Roman Client King of Lesser Armenia. Cotys was the second son of Roman Client rulers of Thrace Cotys VIII and Antonia Tryphaena. His paternal grandparents were loyal Roman Client Rulers Rhoemetalces I and Pythodoris I of Thrace, while his maternal grandparents Roman Client Rulers Polemon Pythodoros and Pythodorida of Pontus. His maternal grandmother Pythodorida of Pontus was the first grandchild of Roman Triumvir Mark Antony. Thus through his maternal grandmother, Cotys was related to various members of the Julio-Claudian dynasty.

Cotys was raised and educated in Rome along with his distant relative the future Roman Emperor Caligula. Cotys was raised in the households of Roman Empress Livia Drusilla and Antonia Minor. While Cotys was growing up he was a part of the remarkable court of Antonia Minor. Antonia Minor was a very influential woman and supervised her circle of various princes and princesses. Her circle assisted in the political preservation of the Roman Empire's borders and affairs of the client states.

In 38 Rhoemetalces III became Roman Client King of Thrace and had married Cotys' sister Pythodoris II. Also in 38 the Roman Emperor Caligula with the agreement of the Roman Senate, appointed Cotys as Roman Client King of Lesser Armenia. Caligula and the Roman Senate gave him a part of the Lesser Armenian Kingdom and some parts of Arabia to rule. These parts of Arabia later became the Roman province of Arabia Petraea.

Cotys ruled in Lesser Armenia from 38 until at least 47. Sometime after 48, Roman Emperor Claudius requested Cotys to abdicate the throne and replaced him with a former Armenian King, Mithridates of Armenia. At first Cotys successfully resisted Claudius' request, with the support of Roman and local Armenian nobles. However, on Claudius' command, Cotys was forced to abdicate his throne so that Mithridates could replace him. Cotys' subsequent fate is unknown.

== See also ==
- Cotys
- Mithridates of Armenia

== Sources ==
- Tacitus, Annals of Imperial Rome
- French version of Wikipedia
- German version of Wikipedia
- Article title
- Kokkinos, Nikos (1992). Antonia Augusta: Portrait of a Great Roman Lady. Psychology Press. ISBN 978-0-415-08029-3.
- Politische Geschichte (Provinzen und Randvölker: Griechischer Balkanraum; Kleinasien [Forts.]). ISBN 978-3-11-008015-5.
