= Roigos =

Roigos (Ῥοιγος; the Latin form would be Rhoegus) was an Odrysian king in Thrace during the 3rd century BC. He is known primarily from his rare coinage and a graffito inscription from the Kazanlăk Tomb revealed in 2008 by Konstantin Bošnakov. Roigos' obscurity contrasts with the apparently secure attribution of the opulent Kazanlăk Tomb to him, and his precise chronological position and relationships remain unclear. According to the graffito inscription, Roigos was the son of a Seuthes, but which of the kings named Seuthes is meant (if a king at all) is uncertain. Given the tomb's location near Seuthopolis and the widespread tendency to associate most spectacular finds in the area with the town's famous founder Seuthes III, Roigos has been declared a son of Seuthes III by some authors, and Gonimase (Gonimasē), wife of a Seuthes, has been proposed as Roigos' mother. Others have pointed out the possibility that the name "Roigos" is a variant orthography of "Raizdos" and have suggested identifying him with Raizdos, the father of Cotys III. While both identifications could be correct, even if the two names are variants of the same name, they could apply to different individuals. Much of this depends on the uncertain chronology of Roigos. Bošnakov dated the Kazanlăk Tomb to the mid-3rd century BC, which would preclude identifying Roigos' father Seuthes with Seuthes III (a mature man in the 320s BC, if not already the father of grown sons in 330 BC, and with no Roigos attested among his several known sons). This would be compatible with a mid-3rd century date for the destruction of Seuthopolis, which has been proposed as a correction to the more traditional association of the town's end with the Celtic incursions of the 270s BC (although the destruction of the royal residence need not have a direct bearing on the date of the tomb). Depending on whether he belongs in the middle or the beginning of the 3rd century BC, Roigos has been tentatively placed as either a great-grandson or as a (unattested) son of Seuthes III: Seuthes III (before 324-after 312 BC) - Teres IV - Seuthes IV - Roigos (c. 250 BC) or Seuthes III (before 324-after 312 BC) - Roigos (before c. 280 BC). If the second conjectural pedigree is correct, Roigos could (but need not) be identified with Raizdos, whose father is unknown (unless he was Cotys II), and whose son Cotys III is attested as king sometime between 276 and 267 BC.

Roygos Ridge on Graham Land, Antarctica is named after him.
