= Rhescuporis I =

Rhescuporis I may refer to:

- Rhescuporis I (Odrysian), Odrysian King of Thrace, 240–215 BC
- Rhescuporis I (Sapaean), Sapean King of Thrace, 48–41 BC
- Tiberius Julius Rhescuporis I, King of the Cimmerian Bosporus, AD 68–93

== See also ==
- Aspurgus, sometimes called Rhescuporis I, King of the Cimmerian Bosporus, AD 8–38
- Rhescuporis II (disambiguation)
