= Cotys I =

Cotys I or Kotys I may refer to:

== Kings of Thrace ==
- Cotys I (Odrysian), ruled 384–360 BC
- Cotys I (Sapaean), ruled until 48 BC

== Other ==
- Tiberius Julius Cotys I (fl. 1st century), prince and Roman Client King of the Bosporan Kingdom

== See also ==
- Kotys, Thracian goddess
