= Cotys III (Sapaean) =

Sapaean Roman client king of eastern Thrace from 12 to 18 AD

Sextus Julius Cotys III (Ancient Greek: Κότυς, flourished second half of 1st century BC and first half of 1st century, died 18 AD) was the Sapaean Roman client king of eastern Thrace from 12 to 18 AD.

== Family and origins ==
Cotys was the son and heir of loyal Roman client rulers Rhoemetalces I and Pythodoris I of Thrace. Cotys' mother is only known through surviving numismatic evidence, which bears her image and her Royal title of Queen Pythodoris.

Cotys' father Rhoemetalces I was an ally of the first Roman Emperor Augustus. Rhoemetalces I was a direct descendant of the Thracian King Cotys I. Rhoemetalces I was the son of a previous Thracian King, whose name was Cotys II and his mother is unknown. Rhoemetalces I was the middle son, who had an elder brother who was called Cotys and his younger brother was Rhescuporis II.

Rhoemetalces I's eldest brother Cotys who was Thracian King and an ally to Roman General Pompey, had sent Pompey a force of auxiliaries under his son Rhescuporis I in 48 BC, during the Roman civil war between Pompey and Gaius Julius Caesar. When Rhoemetalces I's brother died, his nephew Rhescuporis I became Thracian King. Rhoemetalces I became the guardian to the young son of his brother, Cotys. Rhescuporis I died in 13 BC when he was defeated and slain in a battle by Vologaeses, chief of the Thracian Bessi, who was a leader in the revolt against the Romans in that year.

During this revolt Rhoemetalces I and his family had fled Thrace and only returned when the revolt had ended. Augustus then returned Thrace to him and his family. When Rhescuporis I died, he left no heir so Rhoemetalces I became King of Thrace in 12 BC. Rhoemetalces I ruled Thrace until his death in 12 AD. The Roman historian, Tacitus, describes Rhoemetalces I as 'attractive and civilized'.

== King of Thrace ==
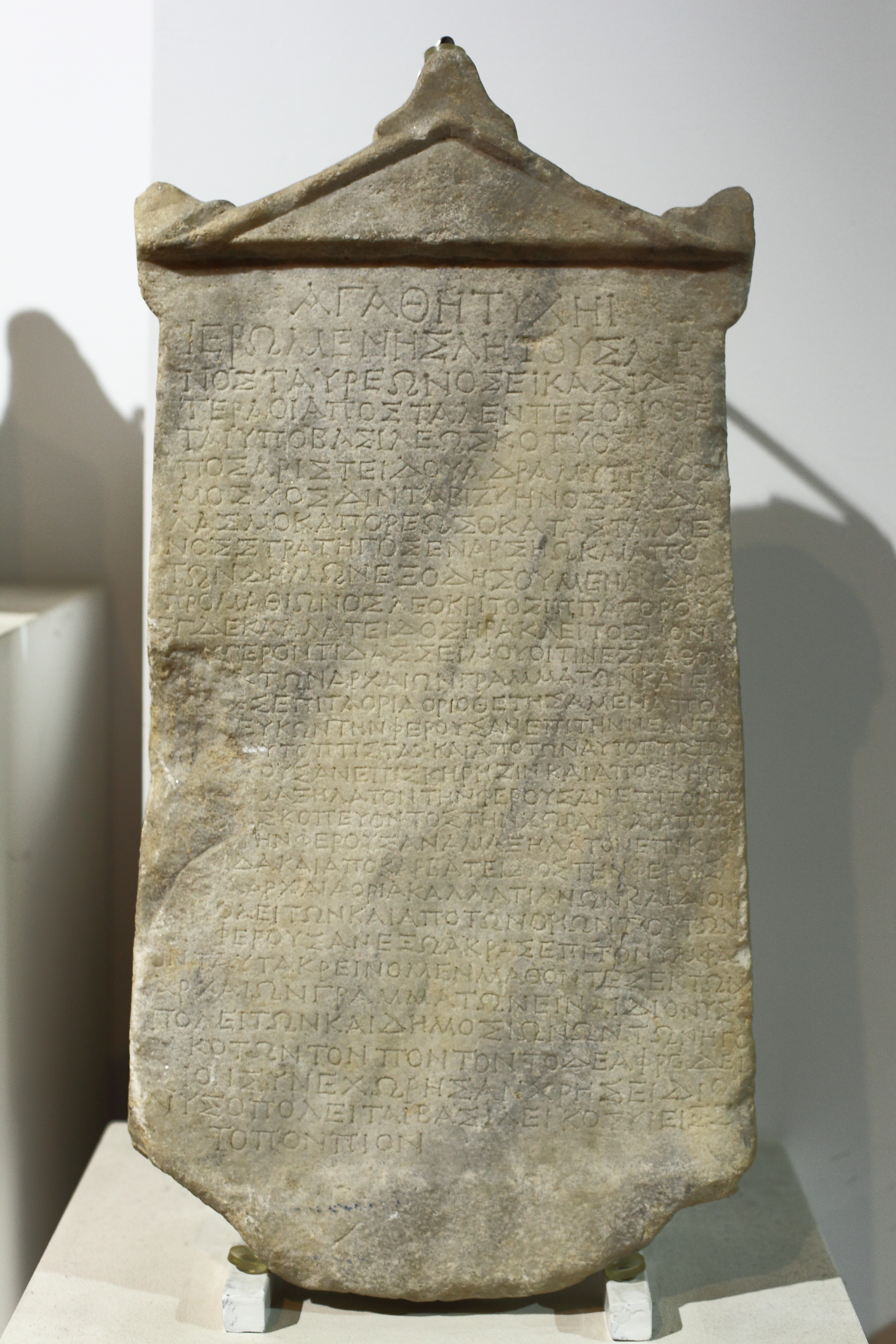
Inscription of king Cotys from Dionysupolis

When Rhoemetalces I died, Augustus had divided the kingdom into two separate kingdoms: one part for his son Cotys to rule and other half for Rhoemetalces I's remaining brother Rhescuporis II to rule. Tacitus states that Cotys received the cultivated parts, most towns and most Greek cities of Thrace, while Rhescuporis received the wild and savage portion with enemies on its frontier.

Not much is known on the early life of Cotys. Cotys had married the Antonia Tryphaena, a Pontian princess who was the daughter of Roman client rulers, Polemon Pythodoros and Pythodorida of Pontus. She was of Anatolian Greek and Roman heritage. Tryphaena's mother was the first grandchild of Roman Triumvir, Mark Antony. However the relationship between Tryphaena and Cotys is unknown.

Tacitus describes Cotys as a man of 'gentle disposition, good natured and mannered'. The Roman poet Ovid, wrote an epistle addressed to him. Ovid praises Cotys for his cultivated taste for literature, and claimed his favour and protection as a brother-poet.

Rhescuporis II always wanted to annex Cotys' kingdom for himself to rule. However, he was unable to do this out of his fear of Augustus. However, when Augustus died in 14 AD, Rhescuporis II decided to take action. Tacitus describes his character as 'treacherous'. Rhescuporis II was at first peaceful in seeking to annex his nephew's kingdom, but when Cotys resisted, Rhescuporis II plotted to kill his nephew. Rhescuporis II invited his nephew to a banquet to ratify a treaty between them. Cotys had not expected trouble and was arrested and imprisoned by his uncle. With Cotys imprisoned, Rhescuporis II seized his kingdom. In 18 AD Cotys was murdered by order of Rhescuporis II who falsely represented his death as self-inflicted. Cotys' wife and children fled Thrace to Cyzicus.

In 19 AD Roman Emperor Tiberius opened a murder investigation into Cotys' death. Tiberius put Rhescuporis II on trial in the Roman Senate and invited Tryphaena to attend the trial. During the trial Tryphaena accused Rhescuporis II of killing her husband. Tiberius found Rhescuporis II guilty and sent him to live in exile in Alexandria, Egypt. On his way to Egypt Rhescuporis II tried to escape and was killed by Roman soldiers.

Tiberius returned the whole Thracian Kingdom to Tryphaena and Tiberius appointed Cotys and Tryphaena's first child, Rhoemetalces II, to rule with his mother. The son of Rhescuporis II, Rhoemetalces III was spared by Tiberius and the emperor allowed him to return to Thrace.

== Marriage and children ==
Cotys had four children by Tryphaena and they were:

- A son, Rhoemetalces II, who was named after his paternal grandfather and ruled with Tryphaena. He ruled from 19 until 38.
- A daughter, Gepaepyris, who married the Roman client king Tiberius Julius Aspurgus of the Bosporan Kingdom.
- A son, Cotys IX, who became Roman client king of Lesser Armenia from 38 until at least 47.
- A daughter, Pythodoris II or Pythodorida II. She was named after her maternal grandparents and her paternal grandmother. In 38, after the death of Rhoemetalces II, Tryphaena abdicated the throne at the request of Roman Emperor Caligula. Pythodoris II married her second paternal cousin Rhoemetalces III and they ruled Thrace as Roman client rulers from 38 until 46.

== See also ==
- Cotys
- List of Thracian tribes

== Sources ==
- Dictionary of Greek and Roman Biography and Mythology v. 3, page 433
- Nigdelis, P. (2017). "A Honorific Inscription from Amphipolis for the Sappaean King Sextus Iulius Cotys". Tyche. 32: 139–149.
- Kokkinos, Nikos (1992). Antonia Augusta: Portrait of a Great Roman Lady. Psychology Press. p. 63. ISBN 978-0-415-08029-3.
- Wilkes, J. J. (1996). "The Danubian and Balkan Provinces". In Bowman, Alan K.; Champlin, Edward; Lintott, Andrew (eds.). The Cambridge Ancient History X: The Augustan Empire, 43 BC - AD 69. Cambridge University Press. p. 555. ISBN 978-0-521-26430-3.

Cotys III (Sapaean) Odrysian kingdom of Thrace Born: Unknown Died: 18
Preceded by Rhoemetalces I	King of Thrace; 12–18	Succeeded by Rhescuporis II
