= Utsurgae =

Settlement and station (mutatio) of ancient Thrace

- Settlement and station (mutatio)
- Interactive map of Utsurgae
- Coordinates: 41°30′49″N 27°52′34″E
- Country: Turkey
- Province: Kırklareli
- Historical region: Ancient Thrace

Utsurgae was a settlement and station (mutatio) of ancient Thrace, inhabited during Byzantine times.

Its site is located near Çakıllı in European Turkey.
