= Cotys II =

Cotys II or Kotys II can refer to two kings of Thrace:

- Cotys II (Odrysian), ruled ca. 300-280 BC
- Cotys II (Sapaean), ruled 42–15 BC
- Tiberius Julius Cotys II, ruled 123–131 AD
