= Cotys III =

Cotys III or Kotys III can refer to two kings of Thrace:

- Cotys III (Odrysian), ruled c. 270 BC
- Cotys III (Sapaean), ruled 12–19 AD
- Tiberius Julius Cotys III, ruled 228–234 AD
