= Thracian kingdom =

Thracian kingdom may refer to:

- Odrysian kingdom (c. 480 BC – 30 BC)
- kingdom of Lysimachus (c. 306 BC – 281 BC)
- Sapaean kingdom (mid-1st century BC – 46 AD)
