= Vize =

- Municipality
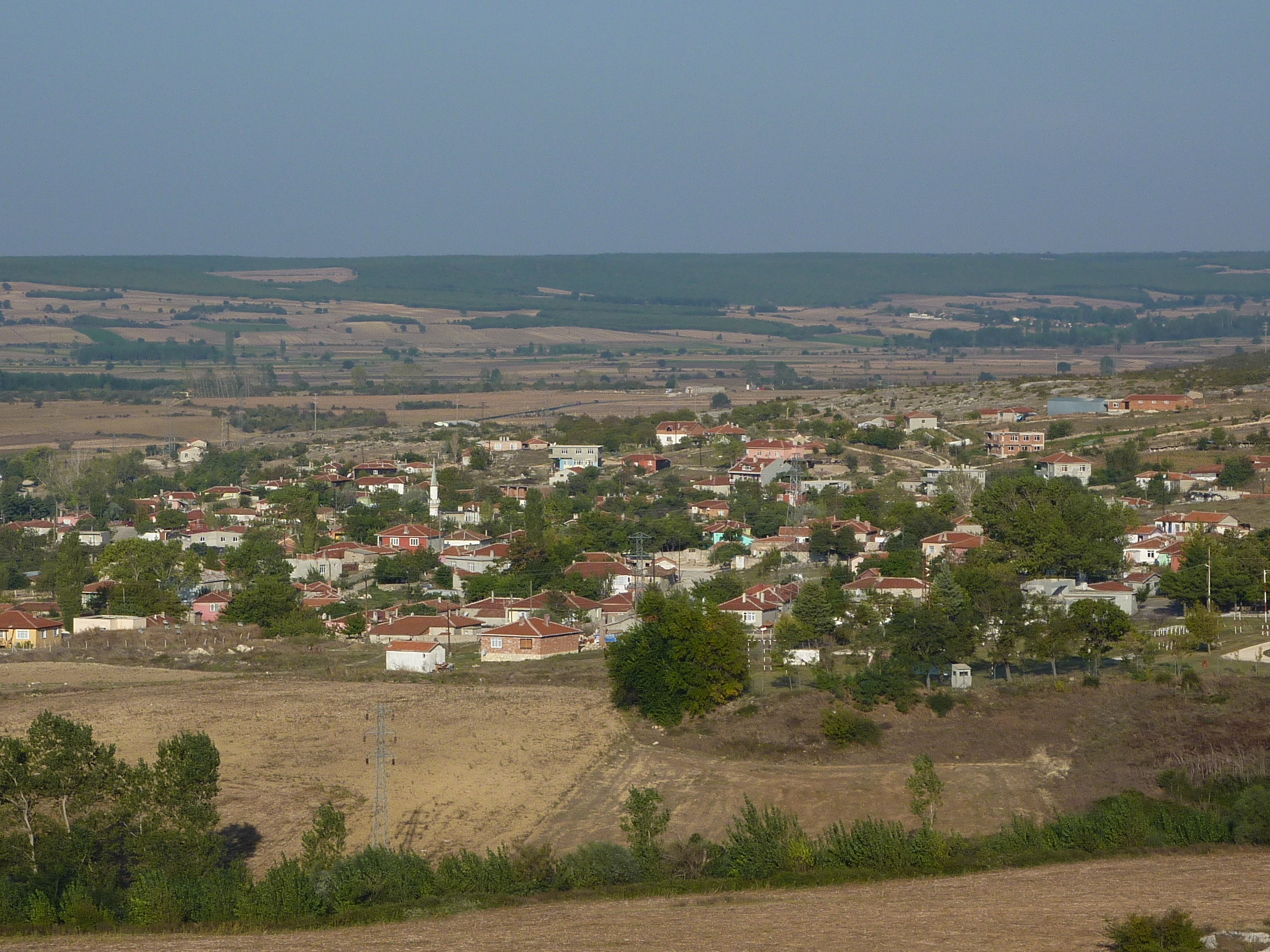

- Location within Turkey Location within Marmara
- Coordinates: 41°34′25″N 27°45′55″E
- Country: Turkey
- Province: Kırklareli
- District: Vize

Government
  - Mayor: Ercan Özalp (CHP)
- Elevation: 168 m (551 ft)
- Population (2022): 15,116
- Time zone: UTC+3 (TRT)
- Postal code: 39400
- Area code: 0288
- Website: www.vize.bel.tr

Vize (Turkish: [ˈvize]) is a town in Kırklareli Province in the Marmara region of Turkey. It is the seat of Vize District. Its population is 15,116 (2022). The mayor is Ercan Özalp (CHP). The town's distance to the provincial centre is 56 km (35 mi). Vize is situated on state road D.020, which runs from Istanbul to Edirne via Kırklareli. In 2012 Vize was designated a Cittaslow (Slow City).

== History ==
=== Antiquity ===
Under the ancient name of Bizya or Bizye (Ancient Greek: Βιζύη) Vize served as a capital for the ancient Thracian tribe of the Asti, and was mentioned by several ancient authors.

From inscriptions it seems that during the late 1st century BCE Bizye was under local rule of the Sapians rather than under direct Roman control.

The martyrs Memnon and Severos were killed in Bizye as part of the Diocletianic Persecution beginning in 303. In 353 CE, the exiled Eustathius of Antioch chose to settle in Bizye, where he later died. The city is documented as the seat of an archbishop, as a suffragan of Heraclea, as early as the 5th century.

=== Middle Ages ===
Beginning in the 6th century, water was piped from Bizye to Constantinople, and some of the pipes are still visible. In 773 or 774, the emperor Constantine V had a bridge built here.

Bizye is described as a city (polis) in the province of Europe in the Synecdemus of Hierocles, as well as later in the De Thematibus of Constantine Porphyrogenitus.

The city appears to be identical with the "Uzusa" (Greek: Οὔζουσα) mentioned by the council in Trullo in 692, which was signed by one Geōrgios elachistos episkopos Uzusēs tēs Thrakōn chōras. Since there is no signature for a representative of Bizye in the document, it is assumed that they are the same place.

Proto-Bulgarian inscriptions indicate that Khan Krum captured and probably destroyed Bizye. During the 9th and 10th centuries the town served as the head of a tourmarches. In the aftermath of Thomas the Slav's rebellion in 823, his stepson Anastasios attempted to take refuge in Bizye but was handed over by the city's residents to the emperor. The folk saint Mary the Younger lived in Bizye after her marriage in 896 to Nikephoros, who was tourmarches here. After her death in 903, she was venerated as a saint, and her cult became very popular in Bizye and the surrounding regions.

The Bulgarian emperor Simeon I captured Bizye in c. 925 after a five-year-long siege; the city's walls were destroyed, and most of its population fled to nearby Medea. Whether Bizye was later targeted during Peter I's campaign in eastern Thrace in 927 is uncertain.

In the 12th century, the Arab geographer al-Idrisi described Bizye as a large and well-fortified city in a fertile valley, with thriving commerce and industry. When Cuman invaders came and looted eastern Thrace in 1199, a Byzantine army was dispatched from Bizye to repel them. They were at first successful, but their initial victory was squandered because the Byzantine troops got greedy.

After the sack of Constantinople in April 1204, Bizye became part of the new Latin Empire as per the Partitio terrarum imperii Romaniae. The city did not submit to the Latins at first, and it wasn't until March 1205 that it was brought to heel, along with the similarly rebellious cities of Arcadiopolis (modern Lüleburgaz) and Tzurulon (modern Çorlu). Just one month later, though, the Latin army was defeated by a combined force of Bulgars and Cumans led by Tsar Kaloyan, who then launched a series of invasions throughout eastern Thrace. Bizye was one of the few cities in the region that remained unaffected by these incursions. Toward the end of 1205, the nobleman Anseau de Cayeux was sent to garrison the city along with 120 knights. Later in June 1206, the emperor Henry of Flanders set up camp at Bizye, which was honored as "mult ere bone et forz".

Sometime after 1225, an Epirote force under Theodore Komnenos Doukas advanced on Bizye, but they were unable to take possession of the city. In 1237, the Cumans again invaded Thrace, and many of Bizye's residents were captured and sold as slaves. In August 1246, the Latin emperor Baldwin II negotiated a deal with the Order of Saint James which would have ceded Bizye and Medea to the order along with possessions in Constantinople. However the treaty was never put into effect. In 1147, Bizye (along with Tzurulon, Medea, and Derkos) came under the control of John III Doukas Vatatzes, who had allied with the Bulgarians.

Either at the end of 1255 or the beginning of 1256, the emperor Theodore II Laskaris defeated a combined Bulgarian and Cuman force somewhere between Bizye and Bulgarophygon (modern Babeski). He then concluded a peace treaty that fixed a new border in the upper Maritsa valley.

From 1286 to 1355, Bizye was the centre of one of three known military districts called megala allagia (the other two were Thessaloniki and Serres. This district covered the entire area stretching roughly from Mesembria in the north to Arcadiopolis in the west and the suburbs of Constantinople in the east.

In 1304, a large Byzantine army was assembled at Bizye, commanded by emperor Michael IX and Michael Doukas Glabas Tarchaneiotes in an attempt to stop an incursion under Theodore Svetoslav of Bulgaria. The Byzantines had already been defeated at Skaphidas and at Bizye they were defeated again.

In 1307, over the protests of the megas tzausios Humbertopoulos, the local population attempted to fight a Catalan force with Turkish auxiliaries under the command of Ferran Ximenes de Arenos. They were defeated, and the Catalans looted the city. The city was again looted in 1313, this time by a Turkish force led by Ḫalil; the Turks were later defeated in battle at Xerogypsos.

In the winter of 1322, Syrgiannes Palaiologos captured Bizye along with Raidestos (modern Tekirdağ) and Sergentzion, but almost immediately lost the city to the forces of Andronikos III Palaiologos. Andronikos himself stayed in Bizye for several days during the summer of 1324 due to an illness. That September, Bizye's annual donation to the Patriarchate of Constantinople was set at 100 hyperpera. Andronikos returned to Bizye with an army in 1328, in anticipation of an attack by his former ally Michael Shishman that never came. In the summer of 1332, the theologian Matthaios of Ephesos stopped in Bizye en route to Brysis, where he had been appointed to office; he only stayed briefly, but he wrote that there were numerous holy wells or hagiasmata (Turkish: ayazma) in the area, which were consecrated to the Blessed Mother. The area around Bizye was described as unsafe due to the presence of robbers In 1327 and in 1331 the metropolitan of Prousa appears as Proedros of Bizye.

In 1344, Bizye was captured by John VI Kantakouzenos, who installed his general Manuel Komnenos Raul Asen as governor of the city. A few years later, in the late 1340s, a force of 1,200 Turkish horsemen penetrated Byzantine territory as far as Bizye. After Matthew Kantakouzenos was forced to abdicate the imperial throne, Bizye remained under his effective control, and he stayed here several times in 1356.

As part of a synodal act in August 1355, which ratified an alliance between the emperor John V Palaiologos and Ivan Alexander of Bulgaria, the metropolitanate of Bizye was given the archdiocese of Derkos as an epidosis for about two years. A similar thing happened with the diocese of Stauropolis, which was given to Bizye between 1356-1361 and 1365-1368, when it was left without a metropolitan.

The inhabitants of Bizye were possibly resettled in 1357 or 58, perhaps because of Turkish brigands taking advantage of the fact that the city's garrison had been depleted by the fighting between John V Palaiologos and Matthew Kantakouzenos. In the autumn of 1358, Manuel Asanes, Matthew's uncle-turned-enemy, asked John V to make him governor of Bizye.

In 1368, Bizye came under the control of the Gazi Turks along with other areas in the southern Istranca mountains. The metropolitan of Bizye was reassigned to Mesembria and Anchialos to compensate for the loss of Bizye. During the Ottoman civil war, Bizye was ceded by the Ottoman emir Süleyman Çelebi to Manuel II Palaiologos in 1403 and then reconquered by the Ottomans under Musa Çelebi in 1410 or 1411. After the elimination of Musa, Sultan Mehmed I restored the town to Manuel II Palaiologos in 1413.

=== Ottoman period ===
Bizye finally came under definitive Turkish control at the beginning of 1453, possibly under Karaca Paşa.

The Turkish traveler Evliya Çelebi visited Vize in 1661, during his sixth journey. He described it as the seat of a sanjak-bey, inhabited by a mixture of Turks, Bulgarians, and Greeks, and famous for its leeks.

According to the Ottoman population statistics of 1914, the kaza of Vize had a total population of 14,109, consisting of 10,020 Muslims and 4,089 Greeks.

== Places of interest ==
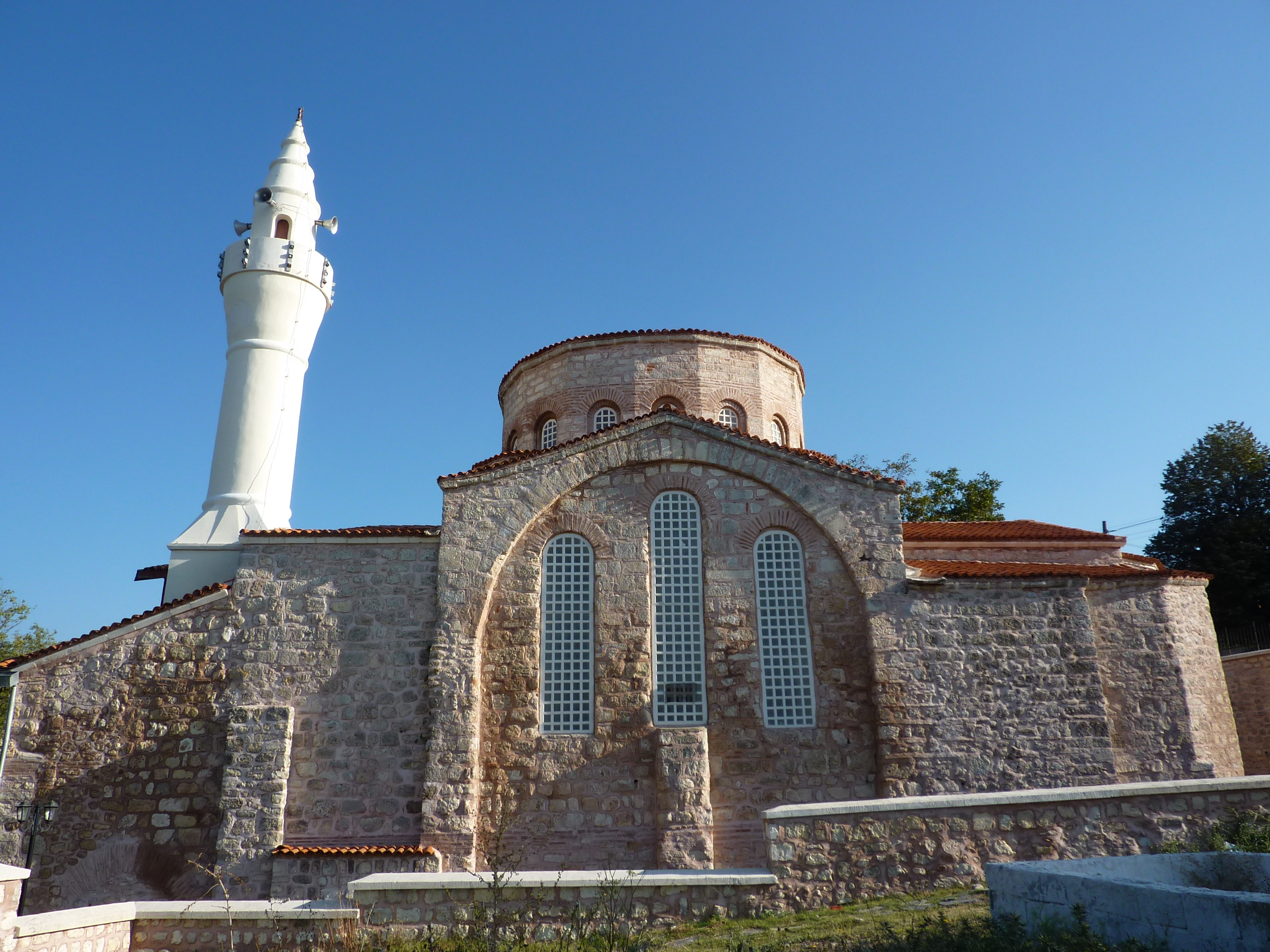
Little Hagia Sophia of Vize (now, Gazi Süleyman Paşa Cami )

The acropolis area on the hill above the town has a commanding position overlooking the surrounding area and still retains some ancient remains; the remains of the ancient theatre were discovered on the slope of the acropolis in the 1990s. Many burial mounds constructed for the rulers of Thracian Kingdom are scattered cross the plains around the town.

Little Hagia Sophia Church (Gazi Süleyman Pasha Mosque) (Turkish: Küçük Ayasofya Kilisesi (Gazi Süleyman Paşa Camii)) is a former Byzantine era Orthodox church built during the reign of Emperor Justinian I (reigned 527–565). It converted into a mosque in the Ottoman era. Designed on a basilican plan, the church was constructed over the foundations of A Temple of Apollo with masonry stone and brick. The cruciform-shaped church consisted of a nave with two rows of columns with three columns each, two aisles and an apse. Its original wooden roof was replaced in the 12th and 13th centuries by a high dome. The building is vaulted around the dome in a style that is not normally seen in Byzantine architecture.

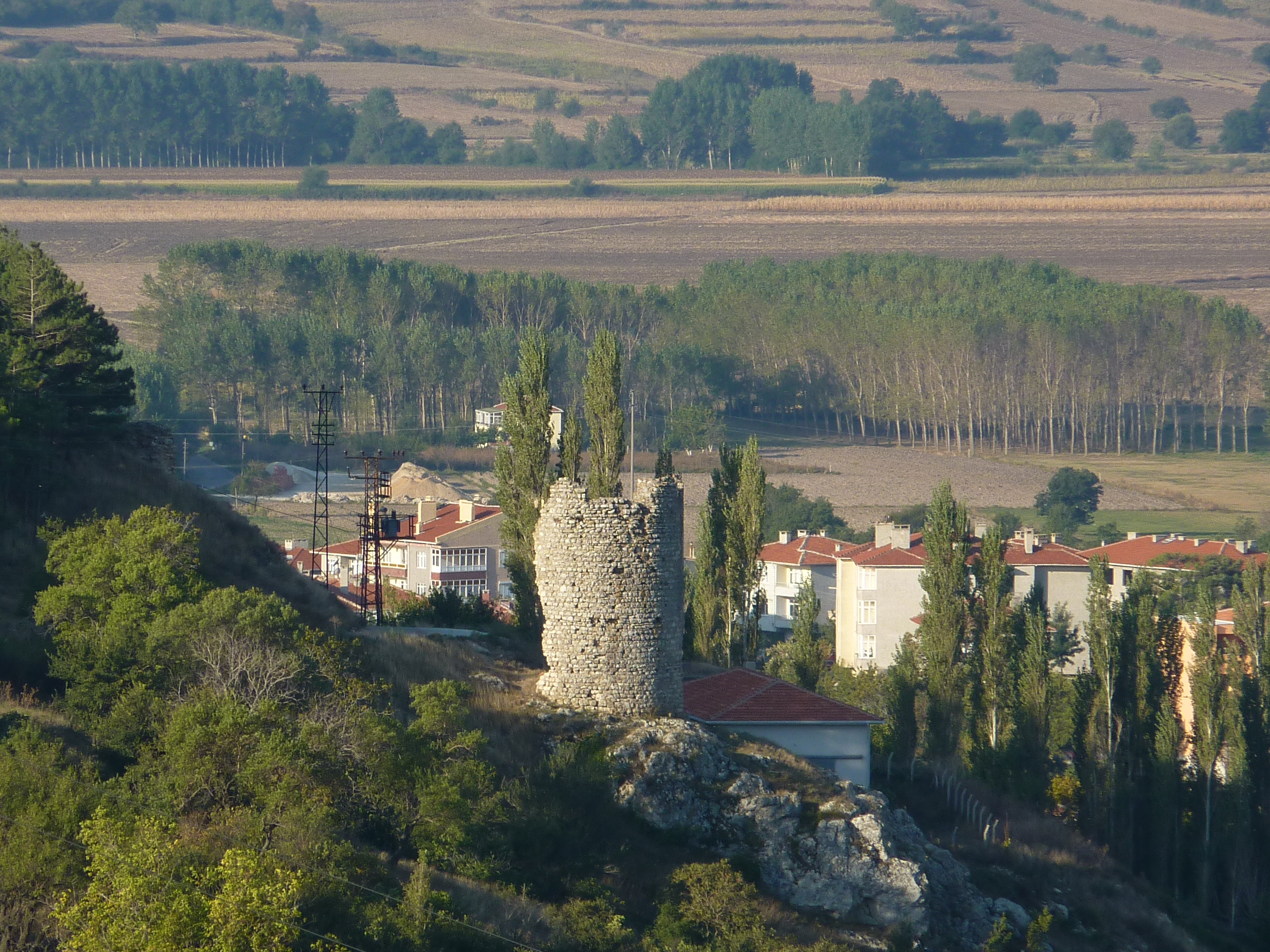
Remains of the city wall

Vize Fortress (Turkish: Vize Kalesi) is a fortification constructed in the Ancient Roman era at the northwest of the town. The fortress is believed to have been built originally in 72-76 B.C., and was revived during the reign of Justinian I. It is constructed of clear cut stones and rubble masonry on foundations with stone blocks of 50 cm × 80 cm (20 in × 31 in) and 100 cm × 150 cm (39 in × 59 in). The bluish colour of the stones of the north wall indicates that this section was rebuilt in the Late Byzantine era during the Palaeologian dynasty. The fortress consists of two nested walls. The western and southern walls are intact. An inscription in Greek letters found at the fortress, says "Here were watchtowers built under the administration of Firmus, the son of Aulus Pores, along with Aulus Kenthes, the son of Rytes the son of Kenthes, and Rabdus, the son of Hyakinthus." It is exhibited in Kırklareli Museum.

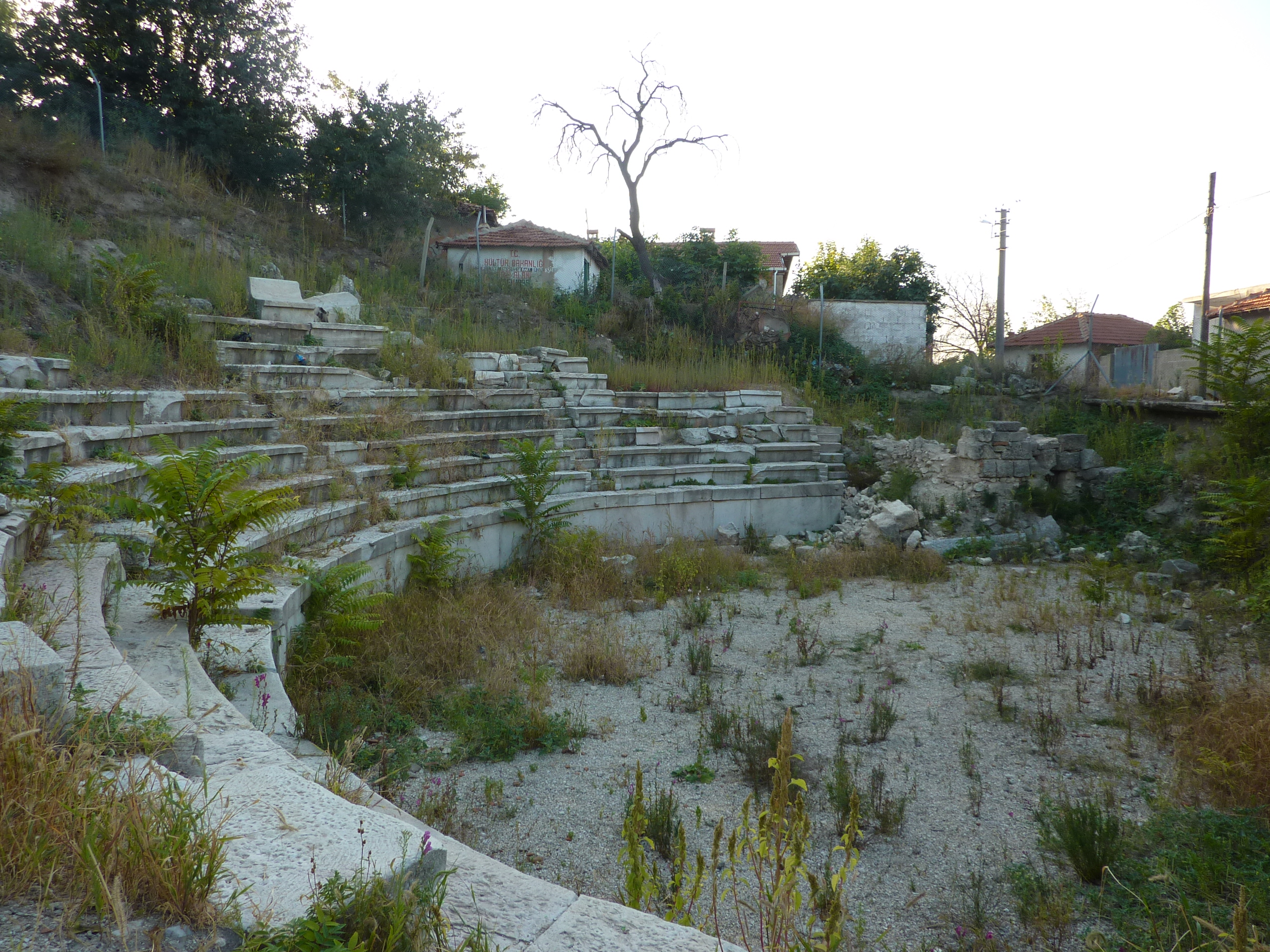
Roman theatre

The Theatre (Turkish: antik tiyatro) was built in the 2nd century during the Late Roman era and is the only one known in Thrace. It was discovered in 1998 during archaeological excavations carried out on the Çömlektepe tumulus. Parts of the cavea (spectators' seats) still exist with aisles between the seats as do parts of the scaenae (stage) and orchestra. Reliefs from the scaenae frons, the stage backdrop, are exhibited in Kırklareli Museum.

The town also has some Ottoman structures, in addition to an ancient synagogue.

== Image gallery ==
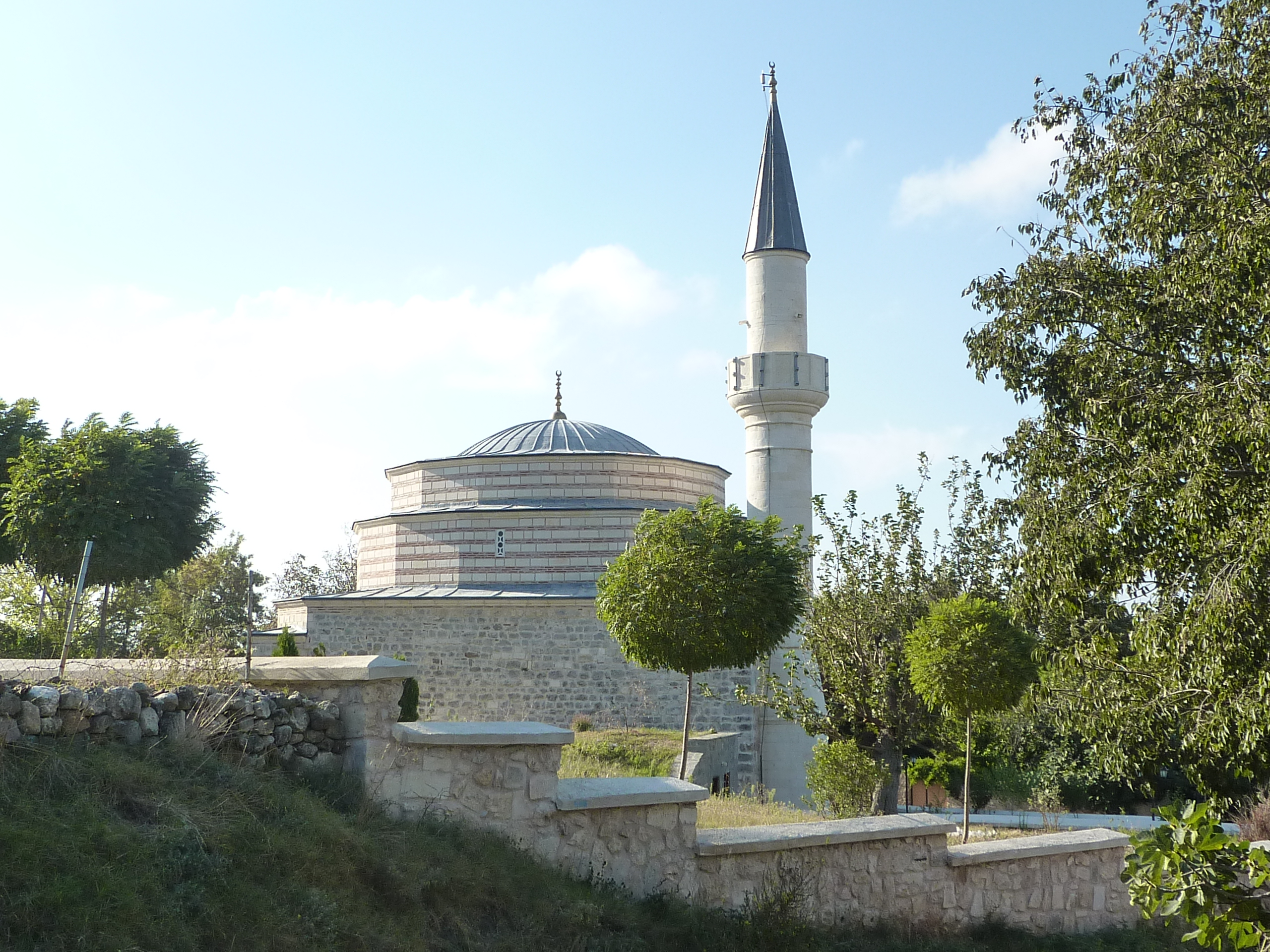
Hasan Bey Mosque

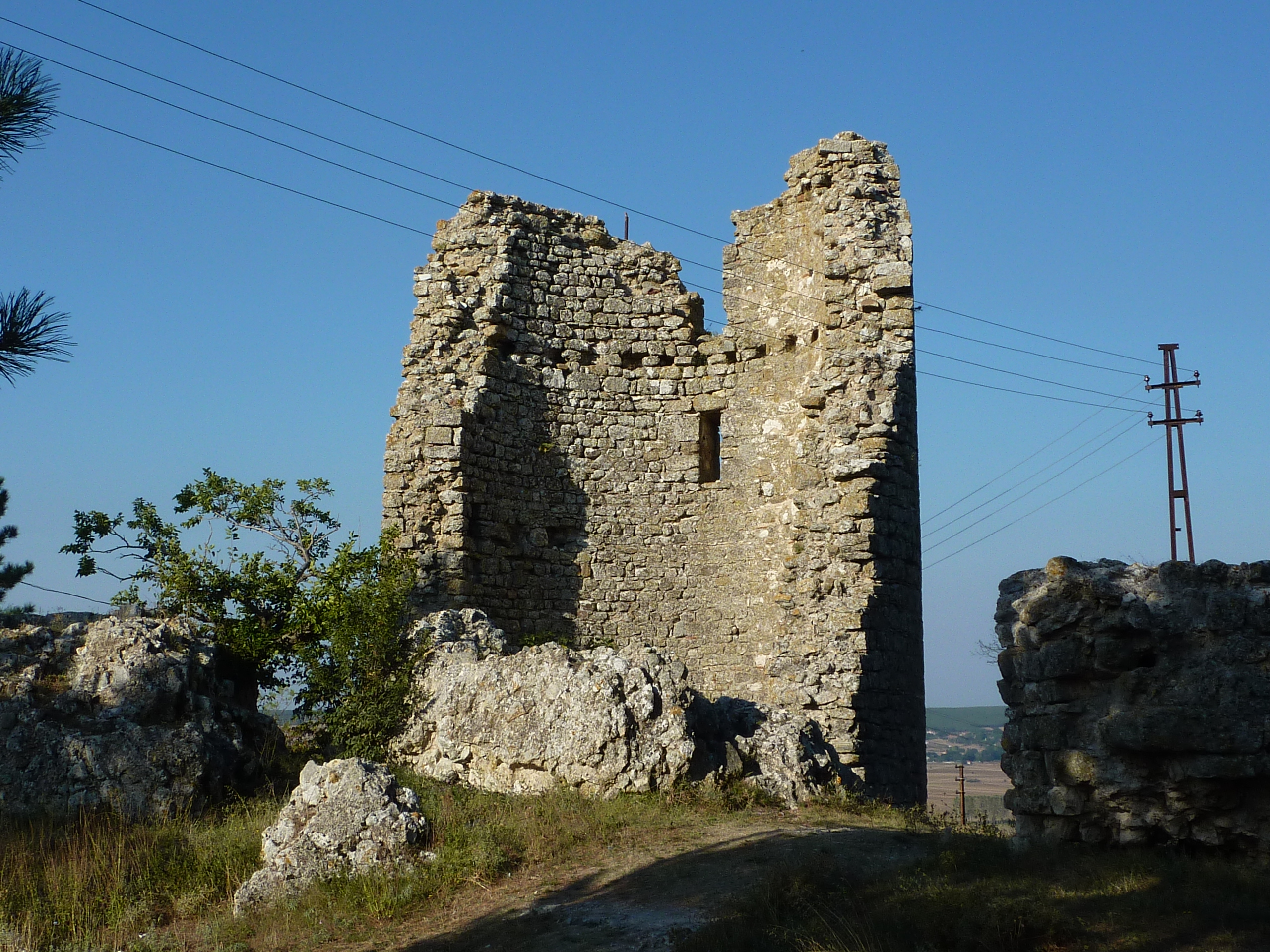
A watchtower on the city walls

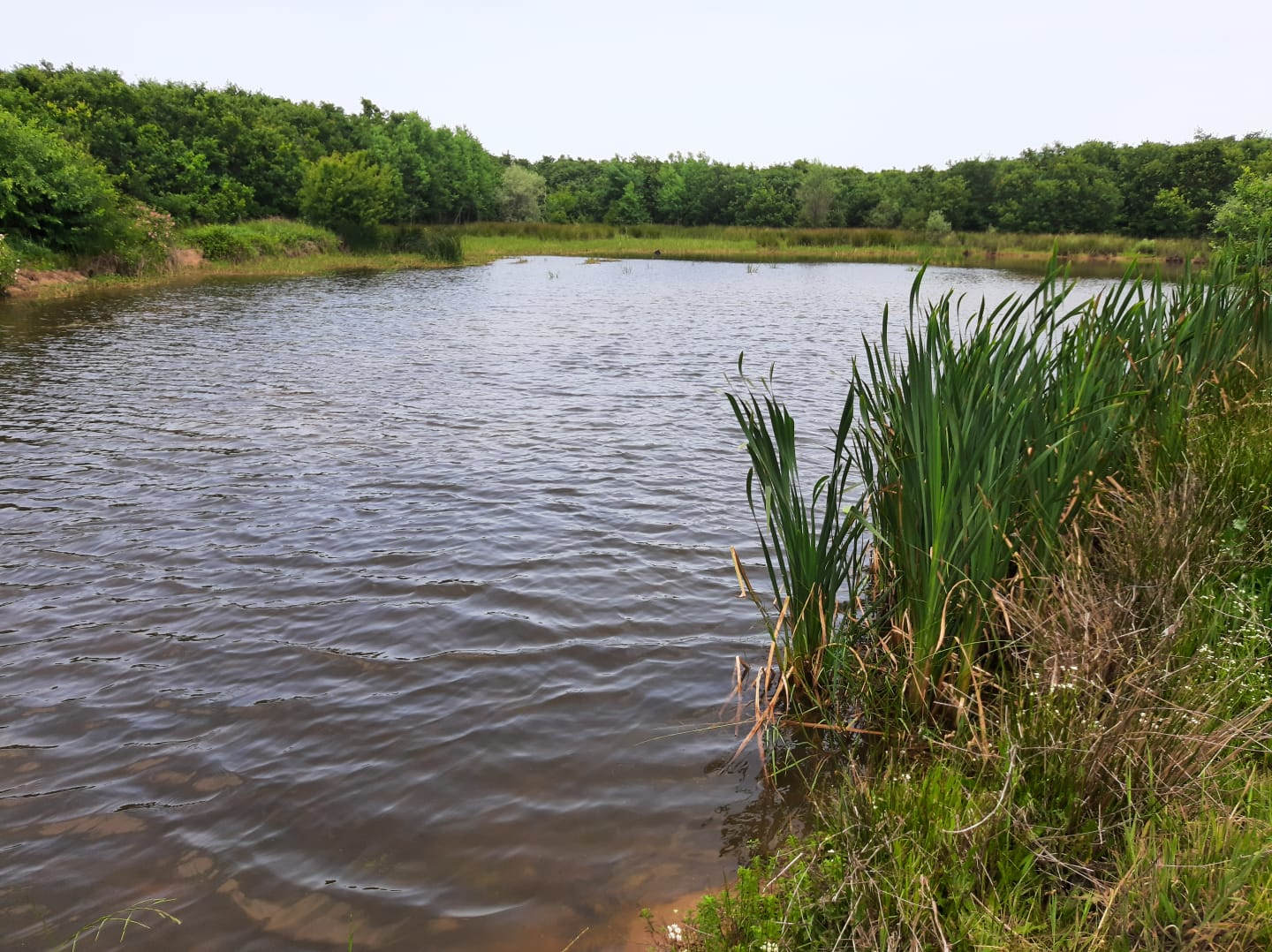
A lake near Vize
