= Antonia Tryphaena =

Roman Client Queen of Thrace (10 BC - AD 55)

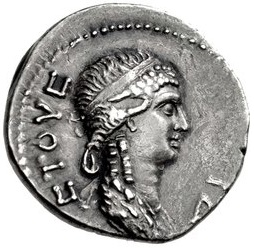
- AR drachme (17 mm, 3.47 g) Diademed and draped bust of Tryphaina right; legend: ETOYC IΔ΄ (Year 14, c. 38-64) around.

Queen consort of Thrace
- Tenure: 12–18 AD

Queen of Thrace
- Reign: 19–38 AD
- Predecessor: Rhescuporis II
- Successor: Rhoemetalces III and Pythodoris II
- Co-ruler: Rhoemetalces II
- Born: 10 BC
- Died: 55 AD (aged 65-64)
- Spouse: Cotys III
- Issue: Rhoemetalces II; Gepaepyris; Cotys IX; Pythodoris II
- Father: Polemon Pythodoros
- Mother: Pythodorida of Pontus

Antonia Tryphaena also known as Tryphaena of Thrace or Tryphaena (Greek: Ἀντωνία Τρύφαινα or Τρυφαίνη, 10 BC – 55 AD) was a Pontian Princess and a Roman Client Queen of Thrace. She co-ruled with her son Rhoemetalces II.

== Origins, family and early life ==
Tryphaena was the only known daughter and the youngest child of Roman client rulers Polemon Pythodoros and Pythodorida of Pontus. Her elder brothers were Zenon, also known as Artaxias III, who became Roman client king of Armenia and Polemon II of Pontus, who would succeed her mother and became the last Roman client ruler of Pontus.

She was of Anatolian Greek and Roman heritage. Her paternal grandfather was Zenon, a prominent orator and aristocrat, who had been an ally to Mark Antony. Her maternal grandparents were the wealthy Greek friends of the late Roman Triumvir Pompey Pythodoros of Tralles, and Antonia.

Through her maternal grandmother she was a direct descendant of Mark Antony and his second wife Antonia Hybrida Minor. Antony and Antonia were first paternal cousins. Her name reflects her descent from the triumvir. She was Antony's third great grandchild and his first great granddaughter. The only other female descendant of Antony's, who bears the name ‘Antonia’, is Claudia Antonia, a Roman princess and the first daughter of Roman Emperor Claudius. Her second name Tryphaena is a name of ancient Greek origin and this name was associated with the Greek Queens and Princesses of the Ptolemaic dynasty of Ancient Egypt. Tryphaena was not a blood relative of the Ptolemaic dynasty. (Note: She was related to Cleopatra VII's children by Mark Antony, but not through the Ptolemaic line.)

Through Antony, her great maternal aunt was Roman Client Queen Cleopatra Selene II of Mauretania, through her she was a cousin to Roman client king Ptolemy of Mauretania. Through Antony she was also a distant cousin to Roman Emperors Caligula, Claudius and Nero and Roman Empresses Messalina, Agrippina the Younger and Claudia Octavia.

Tryphaena's father died in 8 BC. Her mother married Roman Client King Archelaus of Cappadocia. Her family moved to Cappadocia and along with her brothers were raised in the court of their stepfather. Archelaus died in 17. After his death, her mother and Polemon II moved back to Pontus.

== Queen of Thrace ==
Before 12 AD, Tryphaena married Thracian Prince Cotys III. Cotys was the son and heir of the Roman client rulers of Thrace, Rhoemetalces I and Pythodoris I. In 12 AD Rhoemetalces I died, at which point Tryphaena became queen of Thrace.

Only two ancient sources make reference to her: the historian Tacitus and Strabo the Geographer. Tacitus refers to her as Cotys’ widow and Strabo refers to her as the unnamed daughter of Polemon Pythodoros and the wife of Cotys. The Greek geographer Strabo was a friend to her mother.

We also know of Tryphaena from numismatic evidence, inscriptions and buildings she ordered to be commissioned. On surviving coinage, her royal title is ΒΑΣΙΛΙΣΣΗΣ ΤΡΥΦΑΙΝΗΣ (Queen Tryphaena). In the ancient Greek city of Cyzicus (now in modern Turkey) which became second her residence, Tryphaena and her children have left a number of inscriptions. Some of these inscriptions mention her and reveal her descent, for example:

Άντωνία Τρύφαινα Βασιλέως Πολέμωνος καί Βα[σιλίσ]σης Πυθοδωρίδος Θυγάτηρ
Antonia Tryphaena, daughter of King Polemon and of Queen Pythodoris

After the death of Augustus in 14 AD, Tryphaena ordered and commissioned at her expense the restoration of Cyzicus. The city's restoration included works completed on its harbours and canals. She did this as an offering to the memory of Augustus.

Sometime after the Cyzicus’ restorations were completed, Rhescuporis II wanted to claim Cotys’ section of the Thracian Kingdom for himself to rule as one kingdom. Cotys refused to give in to the demands of his uncle. The political disagreement between Rhescuporis and Cotys led Cotys to be captured and killed by his paternal uncle. After the murder of Cotys in 18 AD, Tryphaena fled with her family to Cyzicus.

In 19 AD Roman Emperor Tiberius opened a murder investigation into Cotys’ death. Tiberius put Rhescuporis II on trial in the Roman Senate and invited Tryphaena to attend the trial. During the trial Tryphaena accused Rhescuporis II of killing her husband and forcing him to exile himself from his own kingdom. Tiberius found Rhescuporis II guilty and sent him to live in exile in Alexandria, Egypt. On his way to Egypt, Rhescuporis II tried to escape and was killed by Roman soldiers.

Tiberius returned the whole Thracian Kingdom to Tryphaena, and appointed Tryphaena and Cotys’ first child Rhoemetalces II to rule with his mother. The son of Rhescuporis II, Rhoemetalces III, was spared by Tiberius and allowed him to return to Thrace.

Tryphaena bore Cotys four known children:

- Rhoemetalces II, he was named after his paternal grandfather and ruled with Tryphaena. He ruled from 19 until 38 AD.
- Gepaepyris, she married the Roman Client King Tiberius Julius Aspurgus of the Bosporan Kingdom.
- Cotys IX, he was the namesake of his father. He became Roman Client King of Lesser Armenia from 38 until at least 47.
- Pythodoris II or Pythodorida II. She was named after her maternal grandparents and her paternal grandmother. In 38, after the death of Rhoemetalces II, Tryphaena abdicated the throne at the request of Roman Emperor Caligula. Pythodoris II married her second paternal cousin Rhoemetalces III and they ruled Thrace as Roman Client Rulers from 38 until 46.

While Tryphaena's children were growing up they were part of the remarkable court of Antonia Minor in Rome. Antonia Minor was another great maternal aunt of Tryphaena's. Antonia Minor was a very influential woman and supervised her circle of various princes and princesses. Her circle assisted in the political preservation of the Roman Empire's borders and affairs of the client states.

Tryphaena was appointed by Caligula in 38 AD to serve as a priestess in the cult of Julia Drusilla. In 42 AD, she was appointed by Claudius to serve as a priestess in the cult of late Roman Empress Livia Drusilla. From 38 until her death, Tryphaena lived as a private citizen in Cyzicus. In Caligula's reign, she became the benefactor of Cyzicus and enjoyed Caligula's patronage. Tryphaena was a prominent citizen in Cyzicus. Tryphaena was heavily influenced by Livia's lifestyle. Tryphaena's behavior provided an example to elite women in Anatolia, which was later appreciated by other women in that region.

== Association with Judaism and Christianity ==
Tryphaena's brother Polemon II married the Judean Princess Julia Berenice and through their marriage Polemon converted to Judaism and probably later became a Christian.

Through the preachings of Paul the Apostle, Tryphaena may have converted to Christianity. In Christian literature, the Acts of Paul and Thecla set a Queen Tryphaena, a relative of the emperor, in the city of Antioch of Pisidia; the Epistle to the Romans (16:12) mentions a person named Tryphena, sends his greeting and adds 'who works in the Lord’s service’. A later martyrology connects her with Iconium. The two characters are likely based on Antonia Tryphaena.

Tryphaena of Cyzicus is the patron saint of Cyzicus and she was named in honour of Tryphaena.

== Sources ==
- Tacitus, The Annals of Imperial Rome
- German Version of Wikipedia
- French Version of Wikipedia
- Article title
- https://web.archive.org/web/20130831032735/http://www.ancientlibrary.com/smith-bio/2767.html
- Article title
- "Cleopatra VII". Archived from the original on 2009-10-26.

Antonia Tryphaena Odrysian kingdom of Thrace Born: 10 BC Died: 55
| Preceded by Rhescuporis II | Co-ruler of Thrace with Rhoemetalces II; 19 –38 | Succeeded by Rhoemetalces III and Pythodoris II |
