= Raizdos =

Raizdos (Ῥαίζδος, the Latin form would be Rhaezdus) was possibly a king of the Odrysians in Thrace in the early 3rd century BC. He is attested in an inscription from Delphi as the father of Kotys III, who was king sometime between 276 and 267 BC (the date of the inscription). The date and the names suggest the possibility that Raizdos was the son of Kotys II, himself attested in an inscription from Athens dated to 330 BC (perhaps before he became king, if he is to be identified as a son of Seuthes III). Several scholars have considered the name "Raizdos" a variant orthography of "Roigos", a Thracian royal name found on 3rd-century BC coins and in a graffito in the Kazanlăk Tomb, naming "Roigos, son of Seuthes." Even if the two names are variant forms of the same name, it remains uncertain whether Kotys III's father Raizdos can be identified with Roigos, son of Seuthes (III or IV). No Raizdos is attested among the several known sons of Seuthes III.

== See also ==
- List of Thracian tribes

== Bibliography ==
- D. Dana, Inscriptions, in: J. Valeva et al. (eds.), A Companion to Ancient Thrace, Wiley, 2015: 243–264.
- J. Jurukova, Monetite na trakijskite plemena i vladeteli, vol. 1., Sofia, 1992.
- J. Kabakčiev, "Who was Roigos?," Bulgarian Historical Review (1998) 3–6.
- S. Topalov, New Contributions to the Study of the Coinage and History of the Early Odrysian Kingdom in the Lands of Ancient Thrace, Sofia, 2004.

Raizdos Odrysian kingdom of Thrace Born: Unknown Died: Unknown
Preceded by Cotys II	King of Thrace; 280–? BC	Succeeded by Cotys III
