= Coty (disambiguation) =

Coty is an American-French beauty products manufacturer.

Coty may also refer to:

- Coty Award, the Coty American Fashion Critics' Awards (1943–1984) by Coty
- COTY, abbreviation for Car of the Year awards

== People ==
- François Coty (1874–1934), perfume maker and founder of Coty
- Pierre-Marie Coty (1927–2020), Ivorian catholic priest
- René Coty (1882–1962), President of France
- Coty Clarke (born 1992), American basketball player in the Israeli Basketball Premier League
- Coty Sensabaugh (born 1988), American football player

== See also ==
- Cotys (disambiguation)
- Koty (disambiguation)
