= Ethnarchy of Comana =

Client-state of ancient Rome between Pontus and Cappadocia

The ethnarchy of Comana was a client-state of ancient Rome that lay between Pontus and Cappadocia. It was based around the city of Comana and surrounding territories south of the Black Sea.

It was ruled by a high-priest of Bellona.

== List of rulers ==
- Archelaus I 63-55 BC
- Archelaus II 55-47 BC
- Lycomedes of Comana 47-31 BC
- Medeius of Comana 31 BC
- Cleon of Gordiucome 31-30 BC
- Dyteutus 30 BC- 34 AD
