= Vize District =

District of Kırklareli Province, Turkey

- District
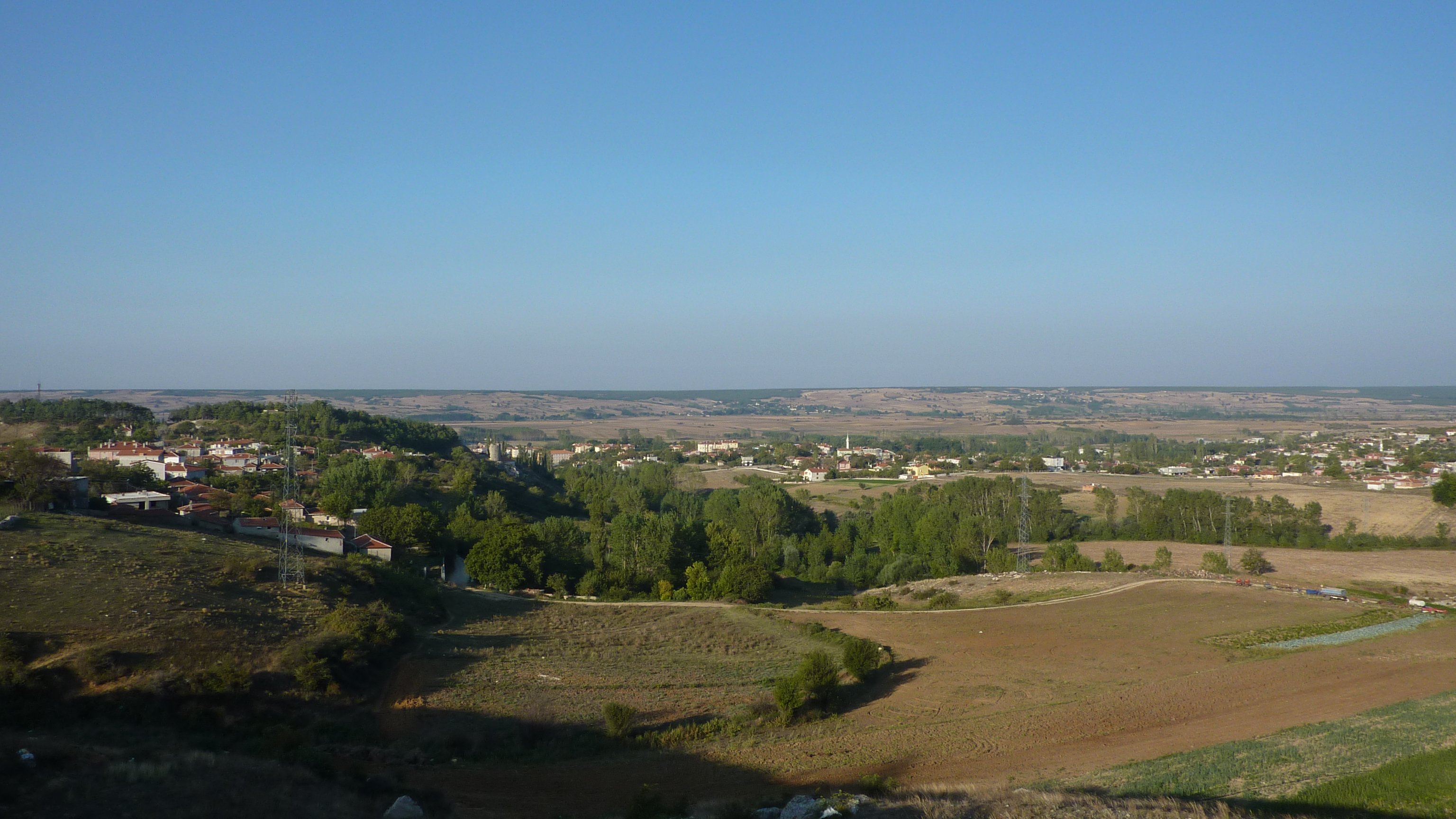
- the town of Vize and countryside

- Map showing Vize District in Kırklareli Province

- Location within Turkey Location within Marmara
- Coordinates: 41°34′N 27°46′E
- Country: Turkey
- Province: Kırklareli
- Seat: Vize

Government
  - Kaymakam: Sedat Özdemir
- Area: 1,090 km^{2} (420 sq mi)
- Population (2022): 28,669
  - Density: 26.3/km^{2} (68.1/sq mi)
- Time zone: UTC+3 (TRT)
- Website: www.vize.gov.tr

Vize District is a district of the Kırklareli Province of Turkey. Its seat is the town of Vize. Its area is 1,090 km^{2}, and its population is 28,669 (2022).

== Composition ==
There are three municipalities in Vize District:

- Çakıllı
- Kıyıköy
- Vize

There are 24 villages in Vize District:

- Akıncılar
- Akpınar
- Aksicim
- Balkaya
- Çavuşköy
- Çövenli
- Develi
- Doğanca
- Düzova
- Evrencik
- Evrenli
- Hamidiye
- Hasbuğa
- Kışlacık
- Kızılağaç
- Kömürköy
- Küçükyayla
- Müsellim
- Okçular
- Pazarlı
- Sergen
- Sofular
- Soğucak
- Topçuköy
