= Pythodoris II =

1st century AD Roman client ruler of the Sapaean kingdom of Thrace

Pythodoris II or Pythodorida II (Greek: Πυθοδωρίς; reigned AD 38–46) was a client ruler of the Sapaean kingdom of Thrace under Roman rule, in association with her father's cousin Rhoemetalces III.

Pythodoris succeeded her mother Antonia Tryphaena and brother Rhoemetalces II. She was a daughter of Tryphaena and the former Thracian King Cotys VIII, and was named after her maternal grandparents and her paternal grandmother.

In 38, after the death of Rhoemetalces II, Tryphaena abdicated the throne at the request of the Roman emperor Caligula. Caligula put Rhoemetalces III on the Thracian throne. Rhescuporis II, the father of Rhoemetalces III, had murdered and usurped the throne of Pythodoris' father. Caligula and Tryphaena arranged for Pythodoris to marry Rhoemetalces III to repair past dynastic rifts. The plan did not succeed. Pythodoris II and Rhoemetalces III reigned together as client rulers of Thrace from 38 until 46, when the latter was murdered by insurgents or on the orders of his wife. The subsequent fate of Pythodoris II is unknown. She seems not to have had any children with her father's cousin. Pythodoris and Rhoemetalces III were the last monarchs of Thrace. Under Caligula's successor Claudius, the kingdom was made a Roman province.

Pythodoris II Odrysian kingdom of Thrace Born: unknown Died: unknown
Preceded by Rhoemetalces II and Tryphaena	Co-ruler of Thrace with Rhoemetalces III; 38 –46	Succeeded by none
