= Cotyttia =

Religious festival of ancient Greece and Thrace

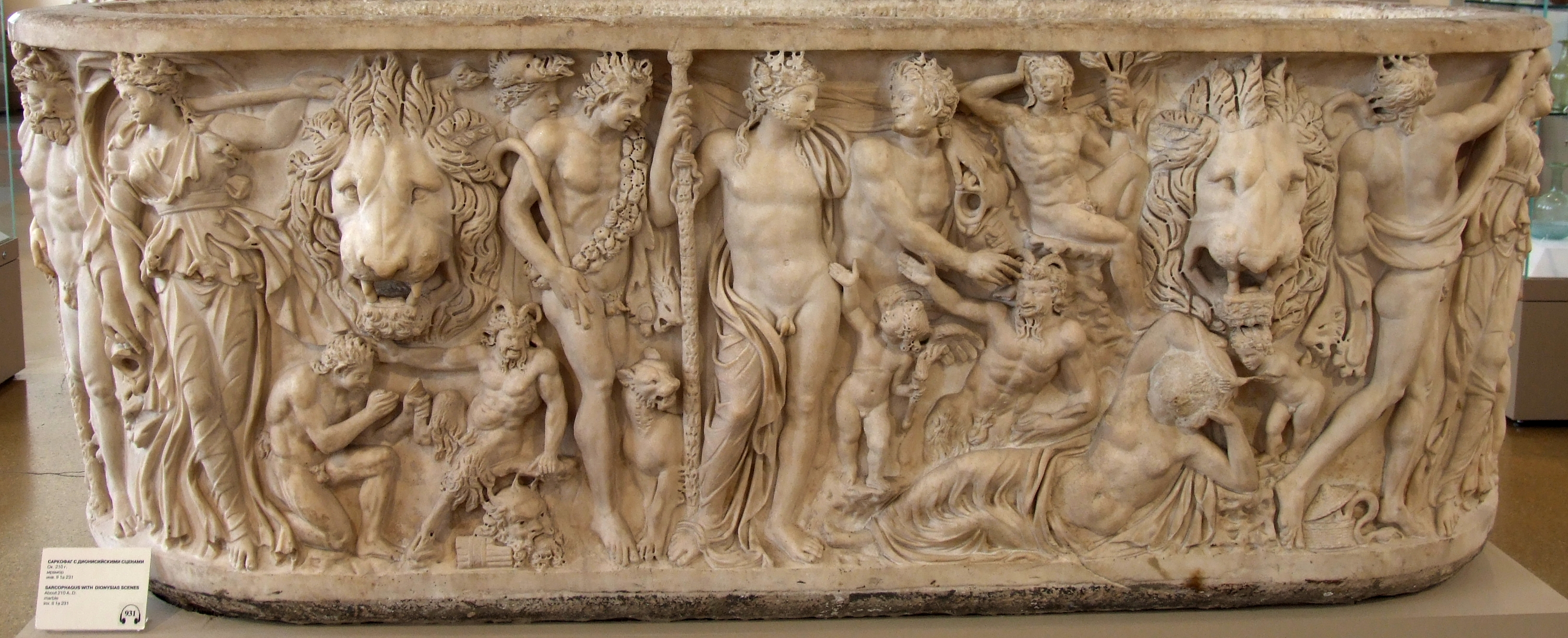
Scene on a third-century A.D. sarcophagus depicting an orgia

Cotyttia (Greek: Κοτύττια, Kotuttiā) was an orgiastic, nocturnal religious festival of ancient Greece and Thrace in celebration of Kotys, the goddess of sex, that some considered an aspect of Persephone.

== Celebration ==
Cotyttia was a nocturnal festival in ancient Greece, "in honour of Cotytta, or Cotyttis, goddess of wantonness. It was observed by the Athenians, Corinthians, Chians, Thracians, and others; and celebrated with such rites as were most acceptable to the goddess, who was thought to be delighted with libidinous excess." Another people who celebrated the festival were the Edones. In Sicily a festival of the same name was held as a celebration of the rape of Persephone. Throughout Thrace it was celebrated secretly in the hills at night, and was notorious for its obscenity and insobriety.

Through influence of trade and commerce, the Edonian form of the festival spread to Athens, Corinth, and Chios, where its mark became so pronounced that "companion of Cotytto" became synonymous with "slut".
