= Bathynias =

River in Turkey

The Bathynias (Ancient Greek: Βαθύνιας) was a river of ancient Thrace that emptied itself into the Propontis not far from Byzantium. This river is probably the same as the one called Bathyrsus by Theophanes, and Bithyas by Appian.
