= Sadalas I =

Odrysian king of Thrace, c.87–c.79 BC

Sadalas I (Ancient Greek: Σαδάλας) was a king of the Odrysian kingdom of Thrace from before 87 BC to after 79 BC. He was the son of Cotys V.

Sadala Point on Robert Island in the South Shetland Islands, Antarctica is named after Sadalas I.

== See also ==
- List of Thracian tribes
