= Baptes =

Priests of the Greek goddess Kotys

The Baptes (Ancient Greek: βάπτης) were priests of the Greek goddess Kotys. The word comes from the Greek verb βάπτω (baptō), meaning "to dip in water". The Baptes practised nocturnal ceremonies, which were associated with rampant obscenity and insobriety.

== See also ==
- List of Greek deities

== Notes ==
This article incorporates text from a publication now in the public domain: Brewer's Dictionary of Phrase and Fable
