= Sadalas III =

Odrysian king of Thrace, 42–31 BC

Sadalas III (Ancient Greek: Σαδάλας) was a king of the Odrysian kingdom of Thrace from 42 BC to 31 BC. He was possibly the son of Sadalas II.

== See also ==
- List of Thracian tribes
