= Rhoemetalces II =

Roman client king of the Odrysian kingdom of Thrace (r. 19 AD-38 AD)

Rhoemetalces II (Greek: Ροιμητάλκης) was a Client Ruler in association with his mother Antonia Tryphaena of the Sapaean kingdom of Thrace under the Romans. He ruled from 19 until 38 AD. Rhoemetalces II and Tryphaena succeeded his paternal great-uncle Rhescuporis II, who had usurped the throne from Rhoemetalces II's father Cotys VIII. The Roman Emperor Tiberius deposed Rhescuporis II and installed Rhoemetalces II and Tryphaena on the throne in his place. They served as loyal client rulers, even in 26 putting down Thracian malcontents for Tiberius. Rhoemetalces II never married and had no children. After his death in 38, his father's cousin Rhoemetalces III, the son of Rhescuporis II, was appointed king, while his mother retired to live as a private citizen in Cyzicus.

Rhoemetalces II Odrysian kingdom of Thrace Born: unknown Died: 38
Preceded by Rhescuporis II	Co-ruler of Thrace with Tryphaena; 19 –38	Succeeded by Rhoemetalces III and Pythodoris II
