= Kıyıköy =

- Municipality
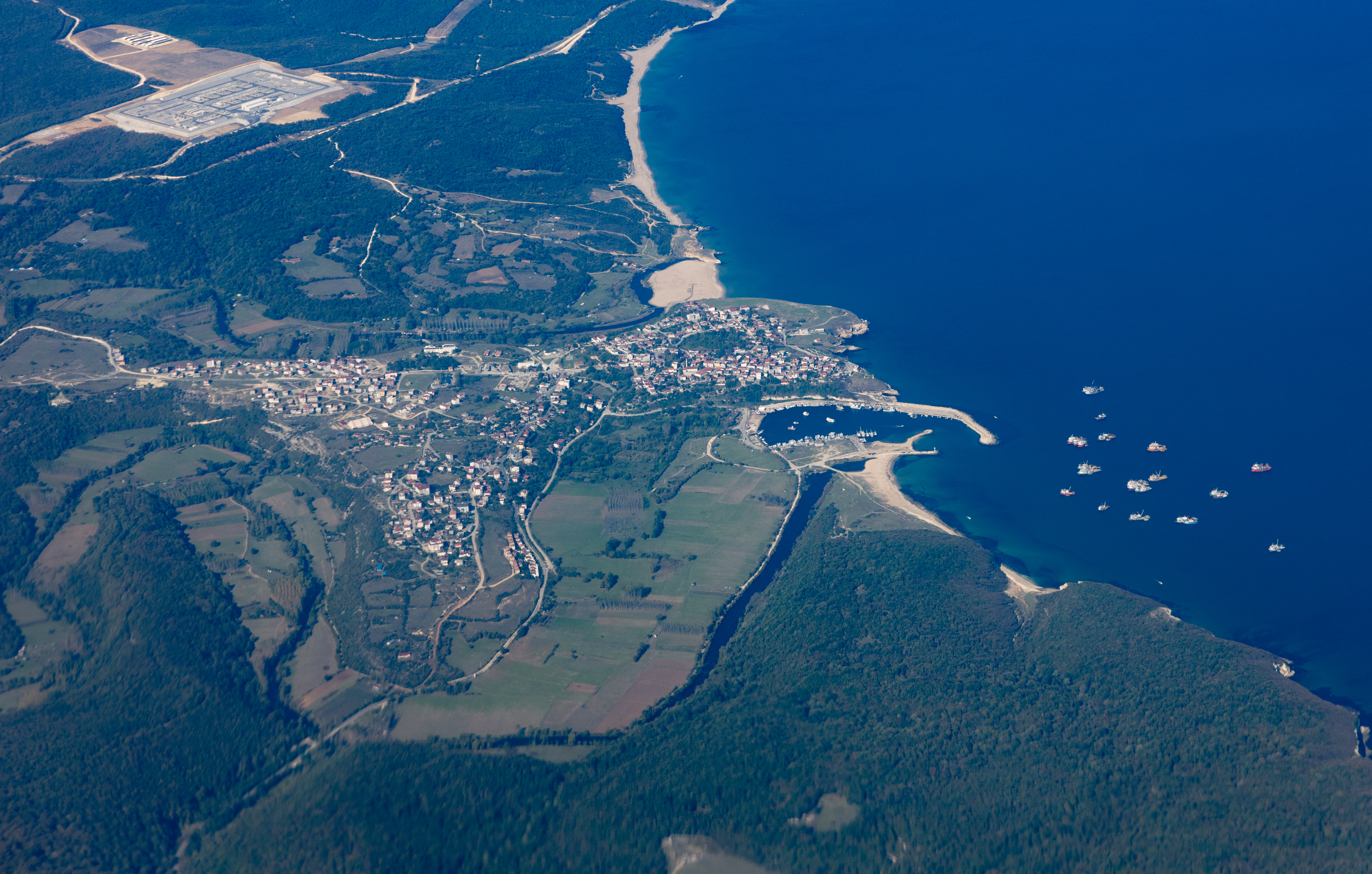

- Location within Turkey Location within Marmara
- Coordinates: 41°38′07″N 28°05′46″E
- Country: Turkey
- Province: Kırklareli
- District: Vize

Government
  - Mayor: Tercan Yatkın (CHP)
- Population (2022): 2,160
- Time zone: UTC+3 (TRT)
- Postal code: 39480
- Area code: 0288
- Website: www.kiyikoy.bel.tr

Kıyıköy, historically Medea (Bulgarian: Мидия; Greek: Μήδεια; Turkish: Midye), is a town (belde) in the Vize District, Kırklareli Province, Turkey. Its population is 2,160 (2022). It is on the Black Sea coast, 36 km (22 mi) from Vize and 95 km (59 mi) away from Kırklareli. It became a municipality in 1987.

Fishing, forestry and tourism are the main local sources of income. The town has a small beach while the surrounding area is covered by dense forest mainly of oak. Two streams, the Kazandere and the Pabuçdere, surround the town in the south and north respectively and flowi into the Black Sea.

The Kasatura Bay Nature Reserve Area is 18 km (11 mi) south of the town along the Black Sea and offers a pristine forest and beach. The only naturally growing grove of black pine (Pinus nigra) in Turkish Rumelia is found here.

The town hosts the onshore terminal of the Turkstream pipeline from Russia.

== History ==
Kıyıköy is identified with Salmydessus, where according to Greek mythology the Argonauts rescued Phineus from the Harpies. Later it became Medea/Midye, a name which means merely 'Middle' in Greek.

It was occupied by Imperial Russian troops after the Russo-Turkish War of 1877–1878, and later by Bulgarians and Greeks following the Balkan Wars of 1912-1913. According to the Treaty of London, the border of the Ottoman Empire passed through the town for a brief period after the First Balkan War; the border was known as the "Midye-Enez Line" (Turkish: Midye-Enez Hattı) or the Enos-Midia line since the town's name was still Midye at the time. The border was moved further west after the Ottomans regained some territory after the Second Balkan War.

According to the terms of the population exchange between Greece and Turkey that took place in 1923, the mostly Greek and Bulgarian Christian residents of the town were replaced by Turks from Thessaloniki in Greece because of their wide knowledge of maritime matters.

In 1960, the settlement's name was changed from Midye to Kıyıkent because the former was regarded as a foreign-language name.Medea remains a Roman Catholic titular see.

=== Turkstream pipeline ===
In 2020 the Turkstream (Turkish: TürkAkım; Russian: Турецкий поток), a double gas pipeline from Anapa near Krasnodar in Russia, linked up with Kıyıköy and went into service. One pipeline continues to Lüleburgaz and supplies Turkey. The second is intended for other countries although its onward route is yet to be determined. It cost €11.4 billion.

== Places of interest ==
St. Nicholas' Monastery (Turkish: Aya Nikolas Manastırı) (Greek: Μονὴ του Ἁγίου Νικόλαου) is a rock-cut Byzantine era Orthodox monastery, built during the time of Emperor Justinian I (reigned 527-565). It is situated about 800 m (2,600 ft) southwest of the town. The monastery consists of a ground-floor chapel with cells for the monks and storerooms. The basement contains a holy well (hagiasma) (Turkish: ayazma) (Greek: ἁγίασμα). The monastery was renovated in 1856 by Metropolitan bishop Matthaios, who also built a wooden annex in front of it (it no longer exists). An inscription reading "St. Nikolas" in Greek lettering is engraved over the arched north entrance.

Kıyıköy Fortress (Turkish: Kıyıkent Kalesi) is a fortification, also built during the reign of Justinian Il, that surrounds most of the old town. Examination of the mortar used suggests that it was renovated in the 9th and 10th centuries. The fortress is constructed on a hillside stretching to the coast between Pabuçdere in the north and Kazandere in the south. Its eastern part is completely ruined. The walls were built with cut stone and rubble masonry and are, in some places, 2.20 m (7.2 ft) thick and 2.50 m (8.2 ft) high. The walls around the second gate reach a height of 5 m (16 ft). They probably rose to 6 m (20 ft) near the (lost) second watchtower. A 13 m (43 ft) wide defensive moat stretched between the third and the sixth watchtower. A hidden gate to the south of the southern walls was connected to the fortress by 180 steps. The Ministry of Culture and Tourism restored the Vize Gate using stone, bricks and wood in 1991.
