= Çakıllı =

- Municipality
- Location within Turkey Location within Marmara
- Coordinates: 41°31′N 27°52′E
- Country: Turkey
- Province: Kırklareli
- District: Vize
- Elevation: 155 m (509 ft)
- Population (2022): 1,981
- Time zone: UTC+3 (TRT)
- Postal code: 39410
- Area code: 0288

Çakıllı (former Erenler and Çakalondon) is a town (belde) in the Vize District, Kırklareli Province, Turkey. Its population is 1,981 (2022). The town is situated on Turkish state highway D.020 which connects İstanbul to Kırklareli. Distance to Vize is 11 kilometres (6.8 mi) and to Kırklareli is 66 kilometres (41 mi). The earliest inhabitants around Çakıllı were Thracians of the ancient ages. In Middle Ages it was a part of the Byzantine and Ottoman Empires. Turkish traveller Evliya Çelebi described the settlement as a settlement where Turks and Greeks lived together in the 17th century. After the Russo-Turkish War (1877-1878) Turkish refugees from Bulgaria were also settled in Çakıllı. Çakıllı was declared a seat of township in 1969.
