= Cotys II (Odrysian) =

Cotys II (Ancient Greek: Κότυς, Kotys) was a possible king of the Odrysians in Thrace in the late 4th or early 3rd century BC. His one secure attestation is in an inscription from Athens dated to 330 BC; the inscription honored Reboulas, brother of Cotys and son of Seuthes. This is generally interpreted to mean that Cotys, not yet king, was the son of Seuthes III by a marriage earlier than that to Berenice (since their four sons did not include a Cotys or a Reboulas). Building on this interpretation of the evidence, a certain Gonimase (Gonimasē), wife of a Seuthes, buried in a tomb near Smjadovo, has been proposed as Seuthes III's earlier wife and mother of Cotys and Reboulas. However, the Athenian inscription precedes the first clear attestation of Seuthes III by about seven years, and various scholars have proposed Seuthes I, Seuthes II, and even a non-reigning Seuthes as the father of Cotys and Reboulas. One scholar conjectures that Cotys was an elder son of Seuthes III but did not live to succeed his father, dying during the siege of Callatis (Mangalia) in 310 BC. While it is likely that Cotys II was a Thracian ruler in this period, it is not possible to establish his precise relationship (chronologically and genealogically) to Seuthes III. The overall chronology and the names suggest the possibility that Cotys II may have been the father of Raizdos and grandfather of the latter's son Cotys III.

== See also ==
- List of Thracian tribes

Cotys II (Odrysian) Odrysian kingdom of Thrace Born: Unknown Died: Unknown
Preceded by Seuthes III ?	King of Thrace ?	Succeeded by ? Raizdos
