= Koty, Pisz County =

Koty
- Village
- Location within Poland
- Coordinates: 53°45′19″N 22°11′14″E
- Country: Poland
- Voivodeship: Warmian-Masurian
- County: Pisz
- Gmina: Biała Piska

Koty (pronounced [ˈkɔtɨ], German: Kotten) was a village in the administrative district of Gmina Biała Piska, within Pisz County, Warmian-Masurian Voivodeship, in northern Poland. The town no longer exists, as the region was converted into a military training ground, the Poligon Orzysz. It lay about a kilometer southwest of Zdedy, and about 112 km (70 mi) east of the regional capital Olsztyn.

Historically belonging to the Masurian cultural region, Koty was established in the mid-15th Century, and its population was entirely Lutheran by the 20th Century. Its name is the Polish word for "cats."

During World War I, 52 soldiers were buried in the town's cemetery, Of them, 45 were German, 3 were Russian, and 4 were unidentified.
