= Cotys V =

Cotys V (Ancient Greek: Κότυς) was a king of the Odrysian kingdom of Thrace from after ca. 120 BC, succeeding his possible father, Beithys.

== See also ==
- List of Thracian tribes
