= Kotys (surname) =

Kotys is a surname. Notable people with the surname include:

- Joe Kotys (1925–2012), American artistic gymnast
- Nick Kotys (1913–2005), American football coach
- Ryszard Kotys (1932–2021), Polish actor
