= Beithys =

Beithys or Bithyas (Greek: Biθύας) was a king of the Odrysian kingdom of Thrace, who reigned from c. 140 BC to c. 120 BC. He was the son of Cotys IV.

== See also ==
- List of Thracian tribes
