= Sadalas II =

Odrysian king of Thrace, 48–42 BC

Sadalas II (Ancient Greek: Σαδάλας) was a king of the Odrysian kingdom of Thrace from 48 BC to 42 BC. He was the son of Cotys VI.

== See also ==
- List of Thracian tribes
