= Rhescuporis I (Odrysian) =

Possible ruler of the Odrysian Kingdom in the 3rd century BC

Rhescuporis I (Ancient Greek: Ραισκούπορις, Raiskouporis) was a possible king of the Odrysians in Thrace in the 3rd century BC. Scholarship has long associated a coin type struck for a king Cotys on one side and a king Rhescuporis on the other and also a king Cotys, father of a Rhescuporis, named in a decree from Apollonia (Sozopol) with the Odrysian rulers Cotys III and Rhescuporis I. However, these associations have been doubted, and some scholars have redated both the coin type and the inscription to almost three centuries later, when the same names and relationships appear again among the Astaean and Sapaean kings of Thrace. It is therefore uncertain whether Cotys III was succeeded by a son named Rhescuporis. If he was, the coin type struck for both kings would be the only certain proof that Rhescuporis reigned, because the Apollonia decree only mentions that he had spent time in the town as hostage on his father's behalf.

== See also ==
- List of Thracian tribes

Rhescuporis I (Odrysian) Odrysian kingdom of Thrace Born: Unknown Died: Unknown
Preceded by Cotys III ?	King of Thrace ?	Succeeded by uncertain
