= Rhescuporis II (Odrysian) =

1st century BC king of the Odrysian kingdom of Thrace

Rhescuporis II was king of the Odrysian kingdom of Thrace from ca. 18 BC to ca. 13 BC, in succession to his father Cotys VII.

In 48 BC, before he became king, he led a body of auxiliaries his father sent to the aid of Pompey for use in the Roman civil war against Julius Caesar. After Cotys VII's death he became king, at first under the guardianship of his uncle Rhoemetalces I, his father's younger brother.

Rhescuporis died in 13 BC when he was defeated and slain in battle by Vologaeses, chief of the Thracian Bessi, who was a leader in the revolt against the Romans in that year. He left no heir, and so was succeeded by Rhoemetalces, who fled Thrace during the revolt and was restored to power by Augustus after it was suppressed.

== Sources ==
- Smith, William, ed. Dictionary of Greek and Roman Biography and Mythology. Boston : Little, Brown, and Company, 1867, v. 3, p. 646

Rhescuporis II (Odrysian) Odrysian kingdom of Thrace Born: Unknown Died: 13 BC
Preceded by Cotys VII	King of Thrace; 18–13 BC	Succeeded by Rhoemetalces I
