= Rhoemetalces I =

King of Thrace, 1st c. BCE

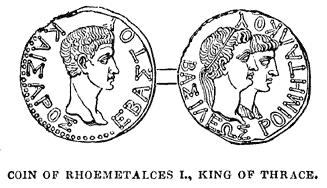
ΑΕ 23.7, 11.1 g., struck 11 BC - 12 AD. The obverse shows the emperor Augustus, legend: ΚΑΙΣΑΡΟΣ ΣΕΒΑΣΤΟΥ; while the reverse shows Rhoemetalces I and his wife Pythodoris I, legend: ΒΑΣΙΛΕΩΣ ΡΟΙΜΗΤΑΛΚΟΥ.

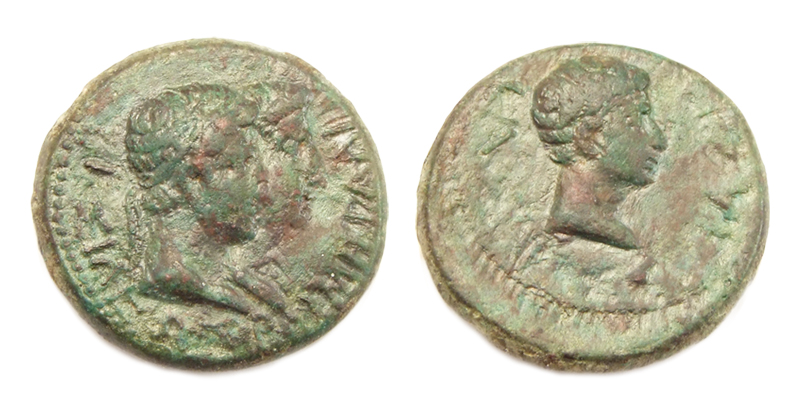
Roman Province, Kingdom of Thrace, AE24, 10.1 g., struck 11 BC - 12 AD. Obverse: Jugate heads of Rhoemetalces I and his Queen Pythodoris I; ΒΑΣΙΛΕΩΣ ΡΟΙΜΗΤΑΛΚΟΥ. Reverse: Bust of August to right; ΚΑΙΣΑΡΟΣ ΣΕΒΑΣΤΟΥ.

Rhoemetalces I (Ancient Greek: Ῥοιμητάλκης) was king of the Sapaean kingdom of Thrace from 15 BC to 12 AD in succession to his nephew Rhescuporis II.

Rhoemetalces I was a loyal ally to the first Roman Emperor Augustus. He was a direct descendant of the Thracian King Rhescuporis I, and the middle child of the earlier Thracian king Cotys II. His younger brother was Rhescuporis II; his sister married to Cotys VII.

When Cotys VII died about 48 BC Rhoemetalces I became the guardian of his nephew Rhescuporis II, his sister's young son and heir. Rhescuporis II died in 13 BC, when he was defeated and slain in battle by Vologases, chief of the Thracian Bessi, who was a leader in the revolt against the Romans in that year.

During this revolt Rhoemetalces I and his family fled Thrace, returning only when it ended, when Augustus returned the kingdom to his family. As Rhescuporis II had left no heir, Rhoemetalces I became King of whole Thrace in 12 BC. The Roman Historian Tacitus, describes him as ‘attractive and civilized’. His wife and the mother of his heir, known only through numismatic evidence, was Queen Pythodoris I.

Rhoemetalces I ruled Thrace until his death in 12. Augustus then divided his realm into two separate kingdoms, one half for his son Cotys III to rule and the other half for Rhoemetalces's remaining brother Rhescuporis II. Tacitus states that Cotys III received the cultivated parts, most towns and most Greek cities of Thrace, while Rhescuporis II received the wild and savage portion with enemies on its frontier.

== Sources ==
- Smith, William, ed. Dictionary of Greek and Roman Biography and Mythology. Boston : Little, Brown, and Company, 1867, v. 3, p. 653

== Notes ==
Rhoemetalces I Odrysian kingdom of Thrace Born: Unknown Died: 12 AD
Preceded by Rhescuporis II	King of Thrace; 12 BC–12 AD	Succeeded by Cotys III and Rhescuporis II
