= Cotys III (Odrysian) =

Cotys III (Ancient Greek: Κότυς, Kotys) was a king of the Odrysians in Thrace in the early 3rd-century BC. His one secure attestation is an inscription from Delphi dated to sometime between 276 and 267 BC (usually given as 270/269 BC), in which he is named as the son of Raizdos, his probable predecessor. Scholarship has long associated a coin type struck for a king Cotys on one side and a king Rhescuporis on the other and also a king Cotys, father of a Rhescuporis, named in a decree from Apollonia (Sozopol) with Cotys III. However, these identifications have been doubted, and some scholars have redated both the coin type and the inscription to almost three centuries later. It is therefore uncertain whether Cotys III was succeeded by a son named Rhescuporis.

== See also ==
- List of Thracian tribes

== Bibliography ==
- D. Dana, Inscriptions, in: J. Valeva et al. (eds.), A Companion to Ancient Thrace, Wiley, 2015: 243-264.
- P. Delev, From Koroupedion to the Beginning of the Third Mithridatic War (281-73 BCE), in: J. Valeva et al. (eds.), A Companion to Ancient Thrace, Wiley, 2015: 59-74.
- J. Jurukova, Monetite na trakijskite plemena i vladeteli, vol. 1., Sofia, 1992.
- M. Manov, "Dekret na Apolonija s novo datirane," Numizmatika, Sfragistika i Epigrafika 11 (2015) 167-173.
- R. Werner, in: W.-D. von Barloewen (ed.), Abriss der Geschichte antiker Randkulturen, Munich, 1961: 83-150, 239-242.

Cotys III (Odrysian) Odrysian kingdom of Thrace Born: Unknown Died: Unknown
Preceded by Raizdos	King of Thrace c. 270 BC	Succeeded by ? Rhescuporis I
