= Rhoemetalces III =

1st century client ruler of the Odrysian kingdom of Thrace under the Romans

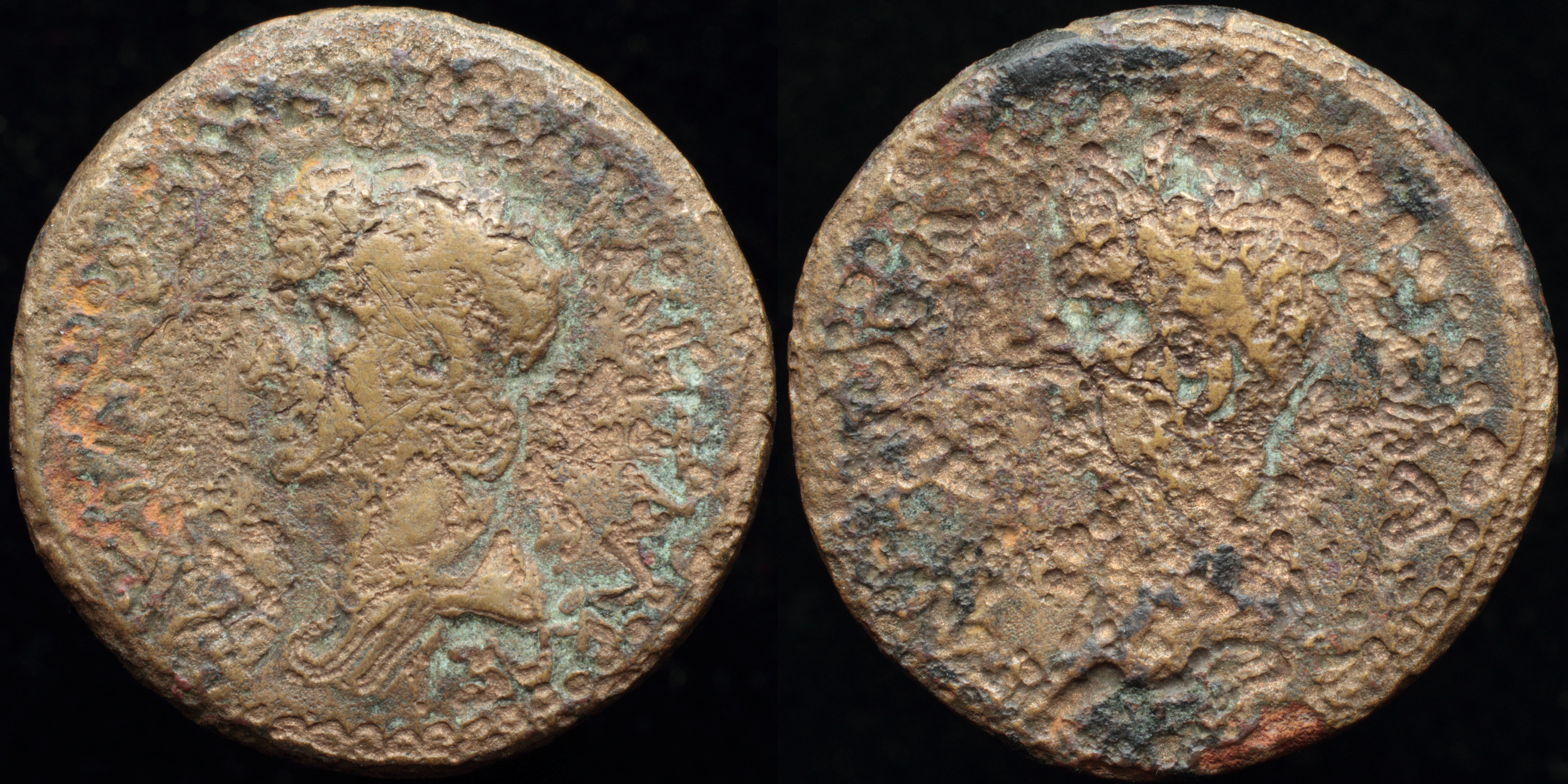

First side of the image: O: diademed draped bust of Rhoemetalces III BAΣIΛEYΣ POIMHTAΛKAΣ
Second side of the image: R: laureate head of Caligula ΓAIΩ KAIΣA PI ΣEBAΣΤΩ
Bronze coin struck in Thrace 38-41 AD. Coin became rusty probably due to depositing in acid soil. ref.: Caligula RPC 1723; BMC 2; Moushmov 5805

Rhoemetalces III (Ancient Greek: Ῥoιμητάλκης) was a king of the Sapaean Thracians. He was the son of Rhescuporis II. In association with his wife Pythodoris II, (daughter of his cousin Cotys III), they were client rulers of the Sapaean kingdom of Thrace under the Romans from AD 38 to 46, in succession to Pythodoris' mother Tryphaena and Pythodoris' brother Rhoemetalces II.

Rhoemetalces III was murdered in 44 AD. The subsequent fate of Pythodoris II is unknown; it seems he did not have any children with his cousin. Thrace became incorporated into the Roman Empire as a province.

Remetalk Point on Livingston Island in the South Shetland Islands, Antarctica is named after him.

== See also ==
- List of Thracian tribes
- Odrysian kingdom

Rhoemetalces III Odrysian kingdom of Thrace Born: unknown Died: 46
Preceded by Rhoemetalces II	Co-ruler of Thrace with Pythodoris II; 38 –46	Succeeded by annexed into Roman Empire
