= Cotys II (Sapaean) =

Cotys II (Ancient Greek: Κότυς) was a king of the Sapaean kingdom of Thrace from 42 to ca. 15 BC, succeeding his father, Rhescuporis I.

== See also ==
- List of kings of Thrace and Dacia

Cotys II (Sapaean) Odrysian kingdom of Thrace Born: Unknown Died: 15 BC?
Preceded by Rhescuporis I (Sapaean)	King of Thrace; 42 - 15 BC	Succeeded by Rhoemetalces I
