= Rhescuporis II (Sapaean) =

King of the Odrysian kingdom of Thrace (ruled 12-19 AD)

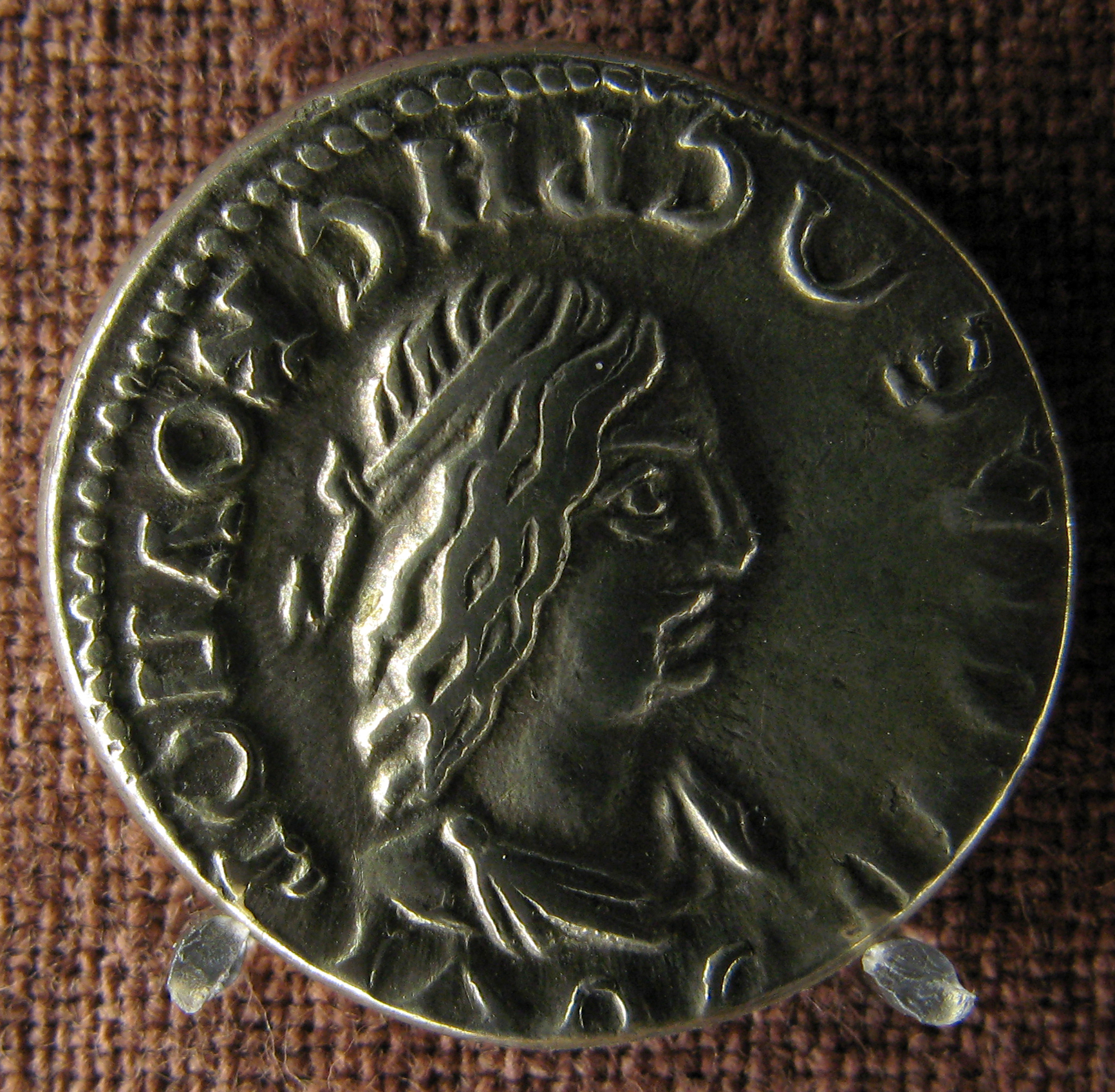
Coin of Rhescuporis II of Thracia

Rhescuporis II (Greek: Ρησκούπορις) was king of the Sapaean kingdom of Thrace from 12 to 19 AD. He ruled half of the kingdom in succession to his brother Rhoemetalces I, and briefly ruler of the entire realm thereafter, usurping the other half from nephew Cotys VIII. He was a son of the earlier Thracian king Cotys VI and the younger brother of kings Cotys VII and Rhoemetalces I. The Roman Historian Tacitus describes his character as "treacherous".

On the death of Rhoemetalces, Emperor Augustus divided Thrace into two separate kingdoms, one half for Cotys VIII to rule and the other half for Rhescuporis II. Tacitus states that Cotys received the cultivated parts, most towns and most Greek cities of Thrace, while Rhescuporis received the wild and savage portion with enemies on its frontier. Rhescuporis wanted to annex Cotys' kingdom, but was prevented from doing so from fear of Augustus. Augustus' death in 14 emboldened him, and he initiated efforts to obtain the remainder of Thrace, at first by negotiation, but afterwards, when Cotys proved resistant, by treachery. Inviting his nephew to a banquet to falsely ratify a treaty between them, he arrested and imprisoned Cotys, seizing his kingdom. Cotys died while incarcerated in 18, allegedly by suicide. His wife and children fled Thrace to Cyzicus to escape Rhescuporis.

The Roman Emperor Tiberius opened an investigation into Cotys' death, putting Rhescuporis on trial in the Roman Senate. He invited Cotys' widow Tryphaena to testify at the trial, during which she accused the defendant of murdering her husband. Rhescuporis was found guilty, and Tiberius sent him to live in exile in Alexandria, Egypt. En route, Rhescuporis tried to escape and was killed by Roman soldiers. His son, who would later rule Thrace as Rhoemetalces III, was spared by Tiberius and allowed to return to Thrace. In the meantime Tiberius returned the whole Thracian Kingdom to Tryphaena and appointed Rhoemetalces II, her eldest child with Cotys, as coruler.

== Sources ==
- Smith, William, ed. Dictionary of Greek and Roman Biography and Mythology. Boston : Little, Brown, and Company, 1867, v. 3, p. 647

== Notes ==
Rhescuporis II (Sapaean) Odrysian kingdom of Thrace Born: Unknown Died: 19
Preceded by Rhoemetalces I	King of Thrace; 12–19	Succeeded by Tryphaena and Rhoemetalces II
