= Kotys =

Thracian/Greek divinity

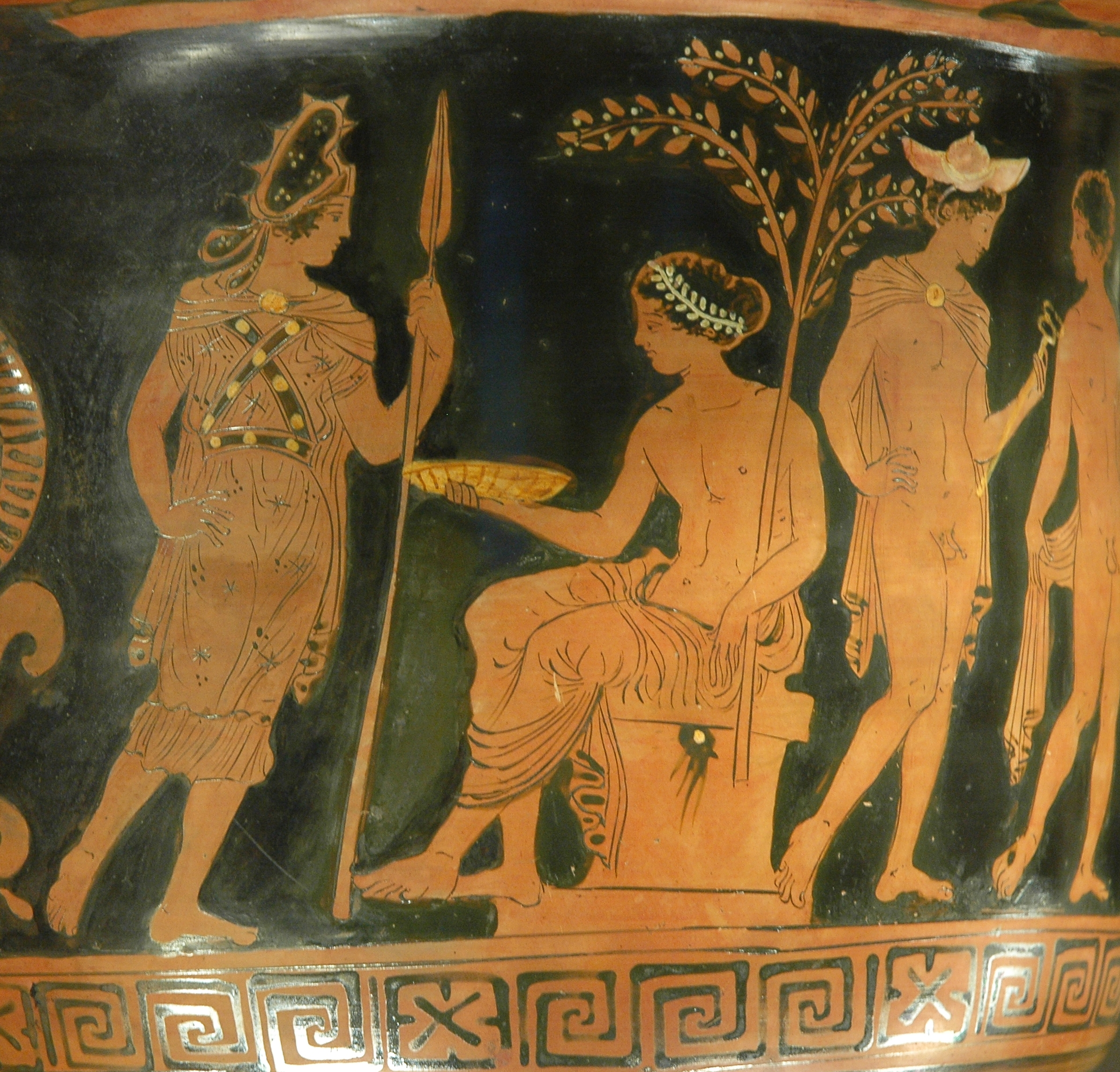
Greek vase painting depicting a goddess, probably either Bendis or Kotys, adorned in Thracian garb approaching a seated Apollo. Red-figure bell-shaped krater by the Bendis Painter, c. 380–370 BCE

Kotys (Ancient Greek: Κότυς Kótys), also called Kotytto (Κοτυττώ), was a Thracian goddess whose festival, the Cotyttia, resembled that of the Phrygian Cybele, and was celebrated on hills with riotous proceedings and orgiastic rites, especially at night.

== Etymology ==
The name Kotys is believed to have meant "war, slaughter", akin to Old Norse Höðr "war, slaughter".

== Worship ==
Worship of Kotys was apparently adopted publicly in Corinth (c. 425 BC), and perhaps privately in Athens about the same time, and was connected, like that of Dionysus, with licentious frivolity. It then included a baptismal ceremony. Kotys was often worshipped during nocturnal ceremonies, which were associated with rampant insobriety and obscene behaviour.

Her worship appears to have spread even as far as Italy and Dorian Sicily. Later relief sculptures from Thrace showed her as a huntress-goddess similar to Artemis, but in literature she was instead compared with the Oriental-Greek-Roman Cybele (Great Mother of the Gods).

Those who celebrated her festival were called βάπται or baptes, which means "bathers," from the purifications which were originally connected with the solemnity: the pre-worship purification ceremony involved an elaborate bathing ritual.

Some Greeks considered Kotys to be an aspect of Persephone, and her cult shares similarities with that of Bendis. She was particularly worshipped among the Edones. The Suda mentions that she was also worshiped among the Corinthians.

== In Literature ==
- Baptae by Eupolis portrays celebrities of the time as worshippers of Kotys who engage in perversion and crossdressing during their acts of worship.
- "Comus" by John Milton briefly alludes to Cotytto as a dark-veiled goddess and mysterious dame whose secret flames burns midnight torches.
- Algernon Charles Swinburne’s poem “Prelude” in Songs Before Sunrise references Cotys's orgiastic nature and role as a goddess of the Edones in Thrace.
- Cotys is the name of the main character in Aleister Crowley’s short story “The Stone of Cybele.” She is not the goddess with the same name, though she bears some similarities, and another character recites poetry about the goddess to her.

== Bibliography ==
- "Cotys", The Editors. Encyclopedia Britannica, 31 Oct. 2007. Accessed 24 January 2022.
- "Cotys (1)", William Smith (ed.) Dictionary of Greek and Roman Biography and Mythology. 1. Boston: Little, Brown & Co., 1867.
