= Rhescuporis I (Sapaean) =

Rhescuporis I was the Sapaean king of Thrace in 48-41 BC. He was the son of Cotys I.

Raskuporis Cove on Livingston Island in the South Shetland Islands, Antarctica is named after Rhescuporis I.

== See also ==
- List of rulers of Thrace and Dacia

Rhescuporis I (Sapaean) Odrysian kingdom of Thrace Born: Unknown Died: 41 BC?
Preceded by Cotys I (Sapaean)	King of Thrace; 48 - 41 BC	Succeeded by Cotys II
