= Cotys VI =

Cotys VI (Ancient Greek: Κότυς) was a king of the Odrysian kingdom of Thrace. He ruled from 79 BC to 44 BC.

== See also ==
- List of Thracian tribes
