= Cotys I (Sapaean) =

Sapaean client king of the Odrysian kingdom of Thrace from c. 57 BC to c. 48 BC

Cotys I (Ancient Greek: Κότυς; died 48 BC) was a Sapaean client king of the Odrysian kingdom of Thrace from c. 57 BC to c. 48 BC. He was the son of Rhoemetalces.

Cotys was an ally of the Roman general Pompey, to whom he sent a body of auxiliaries under his son Rhescuporis I in 48 BC for use in the Roman civil war against Julius Caesar.

On Cotys' death, Rhescuporis I became king under the regency of Rhoemetalces I, Cotys' younger brother.

== See also ==
- List of rulers of Thrace and Dacia

== Sources ==
- Smith, William, ed. Dictionary of Greek and Roman Biography and Mythology. Boston : Little, Brown, and Company, 1867, v. 3, p. 870

Cotys I (Sapaean) Odrysian kingdom of Thrace Born: Unknown Died: 48 BC
Preceded by Cotys VI	King of Thrace c.57–48 BC	Succeeded by Rhescuporis I
