= Tiberius Julius Rhescuporis I =

1st-century Roman client king of the Bosporan Kingdom

T. J. Rescuporis I
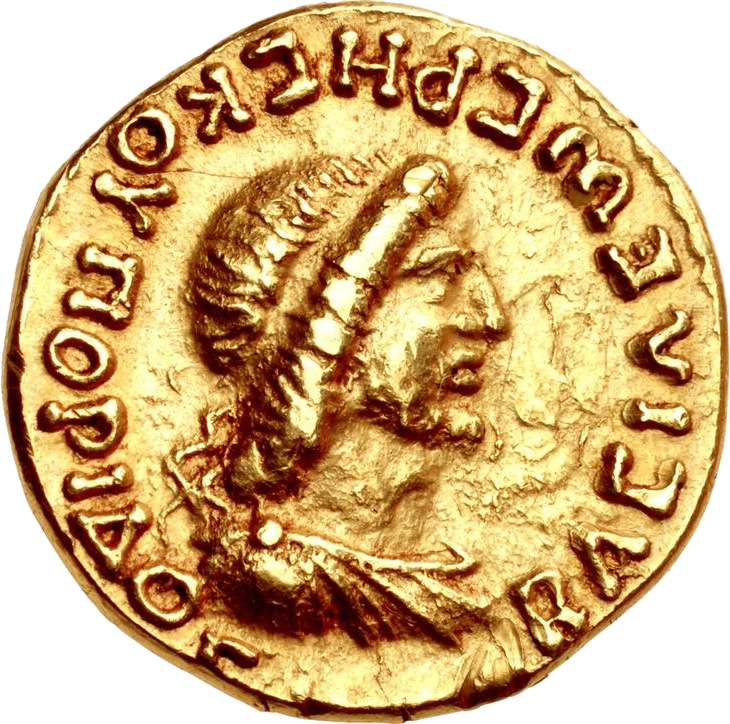
- Gold stater of Rhescuporis I (II), legend: ΒΑϹΙΛΕΩϹ ΡΗΣΚΟΥΠΟΡΙΔΟϹ. (On other side, head of Domitian, τπς΄ = 386 = year 89/90). 19 mm, 7.83 g.

King of the Bosporus
- Reign: 68 - 93
- Predecessor: T. J. Cotys I
- Successor: T. J. Sauromates I
- Died: 93
- Issue: T. J. Sauromates I
- Dynasty: Tiberian-Julian
- Father: T. J. Cotys I
- Mother: Eunice (Bosporan queen)

Rhescuporis I (Greek: Τιβέριος Ἰούλιος Ῥησκούπορις Α' Φιλοκαῖσαρ Φιλορωμαῖος Eὐσεβής, Tiberios Iulios Rheskouporis Philocaesar Philoromaios Eusebes; fl. 1st century – 93), often alternatively enumerated as Rhescuporis II, (Note: After a possible obscure Bosporan ruler of the same name 14–42) was a Roman client king of the Bosporan Kingdom.

== Life ==
Rhescuporis I was the son and heir of the Roman Client King Cotys I and Roman Client Queen Eunice. He was of Greek, Iranian and Roman ancestry. His paternal uncle Mithridates, was a previous Bosporan King.

His paternal grandmother was the late Bosporan Roman Client Queen Gepaepyris. Through her, Rhescuporis I was a descendant of the Roman Triumvir Mark Antony from his second marriage to his paternal cousin Antonia Hybrida Minor (second daughter of Roman Republican Politician Gaius Antonius Hybrida, Antony's paternal uncle), thus Rhescuporis I was related to various members of the Julio-Claudian dynasty. Through Gepaepyris, he was a descendant of Roman Client Rulers Polemon I of Pontus, Pythodorida of Pontus and Cotys VIII of Thrace. The name of Rhescuporis I is an ancestral monarch name of Thracian origin that derived from the family of his paternal grandmother.

His paternal grandfather was the late Bosporan Roman Client King Aspurgus. Through him, Rhescuporis I, was a descendant of the Greek Macedonian Kings: Antigonus I Monophthalmus, Seleucus I Nicator and the regent, Antipater. These three men served under King Alexander the Great. Through his grandfather, Rhescuporis I was a descendant of the monarchs Mithridates VI of Pontus and his first wife, his sister Laodice and the previous Bosporan King Asander.

=== Reign ===
Little is known of the life of Rhescuporis I. In 63 for unknown reasons, the Roman Emperor Nero disposed Cotys I, and his fate afterwards is unknown. The Bosporan Kingdom was incorporated as a part of the Roman Province of Moesia Inferior from 63 to 68. Perhaps Nero wanted to minimize the role, power and influence of local client rulers and desired the Bosporan to be completely governed by the Roman state.

In June 68, Nero had died and Galba succeeded Nero as Roman Emperor. With the help from his mother, Rhescuporis I successfully attempted to have the Bosporan Kingdom restored as a client kingdom to him from Galba. He was able to make the Bosporan Kingdom stable and semi-independent once more. At least in the first year of his reign, his mother co-ruled with him and acted as his regent. The Bosporan Kingdom was able to continue their trade with Anatolia. His royal title on coins is in Greek: ΒΑΣΙΛΕΩΣ ΡΗΣΚΟΥΠΟΡΙΔΟΣ or of King Rhescuporis. Rhescuporis I was a contemporary of the rule to the Year of the Four Emperors, the Flavian dynasty, in particular the reign of Roman Emperor Domitian.

Rhescuporis I reigned as king until AD 93. His wife is unknown, but from this marriage he had a son Sauromates I, who succeeded him. Through Sauromates I, Rhescuporis I had many descendants who ruled the Bosporan throne until the mid-4th century, four of whom bore his name.

== See also ==
- Roman Crimea

== Notes ==
| Preceded by Cotys I | King of the Bosporus; 78-93 | Succeeded by Sauromates I |
