= Sauromates I =

King of the Bosporus from 93 to 123

T. J. Sauromates I
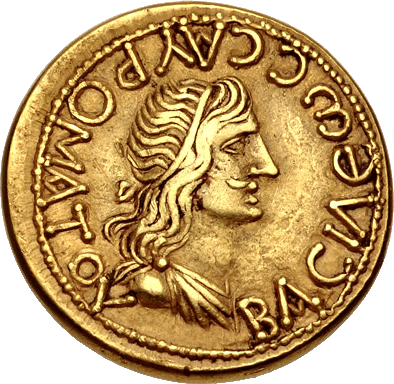
- Coin of Sauromates I, legend: BACΙΛΕΩC CΑΥΡΟΜΑΤΟΥ. (Other side: head of Hadrian, year ΥΙΗ΄ = 418 = 121/2). 19 mm, 7.82 gr.

King of the Bosporus
- Reign: 93–123
- Predecessor: T. J. Rhescuporis I
- Successor: T. J. Cotys II
- Died: 123
- Issue: T. J. Cotys II
- Dynasty: Tiberian-Julian
- Father: T. J. Rhescuporis I

Sauromates I (Greek: Τιβέριος Ἰούλιος Σαυρομάτης Α' Φιλοκαῖσαρ Φιλορωμαῖος Εὐσεβής, Tiberios Iulios Sauromates Philocaesar Philoromaios Eusebes, means lover of Caesar, lover of Rome who is the Pius one; fl. Late 1st century – 123) was a Roman client king of the Bosporan Kingdom.

Sauromates I was the son and heir of the Bosporan king Rhescuporis II. He was of Greek, Iranian and Roman ancestry. The name Sauromates is a name of Sarmatian origin. His paternal grandparents were the previous ruling Bosporan Monarchs Cotys I and Eunice.

Through his paternal grandfather, Sauromates I was a descendant of the Roman Triumvir Mark Antony from his second marriage to his paternal cousin Antonia Hybrida Minor (second daughter of Roman Republican Politician Gaius Antonius Hybrida, Antony's paternal uncle), thus Sauromates I was related to various members of the Julio-Claudian dynasty. He was also a descendant of Roman Client Rulers Polemon I of Pontus, Pythodorida of Pontus and Cotys VIII of Thrace. Through his paternal grandfather, Sauromates I was a descendant of Greek Macedonian Kings: Antigonus I Monophthalmus, Seleucus I Nicator and Regent, Antipater. These three men served under King Alexander the Great. He is also descended from the Monarchs Mithridates VI of Pontus and his first wife, his sister Laodice and the previous Bosporan King Asander.

When Rhescuporis II died in 93, Sauromates I succeeded his father as Bosporan King and reigned until his own death in 123. He was a contemporary of the Roman Emperors Domitian, Nerva, Trajan and Hadrian. Sauromates I continued his father's legacy of rebuilding the Bosporan Kingdom. In 68, Rhescuporis II had restored the Bosporan Kingdom, previously a part of the Roman province of Moesia Inferior, as a semi-independent Roman Client State. On coins, his royal title is in Greek: ΒΑΣΙΛΕΩΣ ΣΑΥΡΟΜΑΤΟΥ or of King Sauromates.

Either Rhescuporis II or Sauromates I established Phanagoria as the new capital city of the Bosporan Kingdom. From the late 1st century, Panticapaeum, the original capital city, had gradually lost its importance. Phanagoria became the new capital city because of the increasing popularity of the city's titulary goddess, Aphrodite, and her cult.

In 105, Sauromates I, entrusted and appointed a priest as an official to oversee the restoration of the porticos at the temple at Hermonassa. Out of his personal religious devotion in 110, he erected a temple dedicated to Aphrodite in Gorgippia. In an honorific inscription dedicated to Sauromates I, found in Nicaea, Sauromates I was given the honorific title Ktistes or Founder. He was awarded this title because of his goodness, generosity and his contributions throughout the Bosporan and Anatolia.

Sauromates I is mentioned in the letters of Roman Senator Pliny the Younger. About 113, Pliny served as the Roman Governor of Bithynia. Sauromates I sent his ambassador (legatus) to travel to Bithynia to deliver two letters to Pliny. The nature of these letters is unknown. The first letter requested Pliny, for a messenger to use a diploma (a permit to use an official wagon) to assist the messenger's journey, which Pliny respected. The second letter was for Trajan. Pliny learned no more than that it contained news which Trajan needed to know. An imperial freedman called Lycormas took the second letter from Bithynia to Rome for Trajan, a journey that would have taken 6–8 weeks.

At Panticapaeum, there is in Latin an honorific inscription, dedicating and honoring Sauromates I:

King Tiberius Julius Sauromates, an outstanding friend of Emperor and the populus Romanus.

Sauromates I had at least one son, Cotys II. Cotys II would succeed his father. Through his son, Sauromates I would have three descendants ruling the Bosporan that would bear his name.

== See also ==
- Bosporan Kingdom
- Roman Crimea

== Sources ==
- The supreme gods of the Bosporan Kingdom: Celestial Aphrodite and the Most High God By Yulia Ustinova Edition: illustrated Published by BRILL, 1999 ISBN 90-04-11231-6, ISBN 978-90-04-11231-5
- Rome, the Greek world, and the East By Fergus Millar, Hannah M. Cotton, Guy M. Rogers Edition: illustrated Published by UNC Press, 2004 ISBN 0-8078-5520-0, ISBN 978-0-8078-5520-1

Preceded by Rhescuporis I	King of the Bosporus; 93–123	Succeeded by Cotys II
