= Sauromates II =

King of the Bosporan Kingdom from c.172 to c.210

T. J. Sauromates II
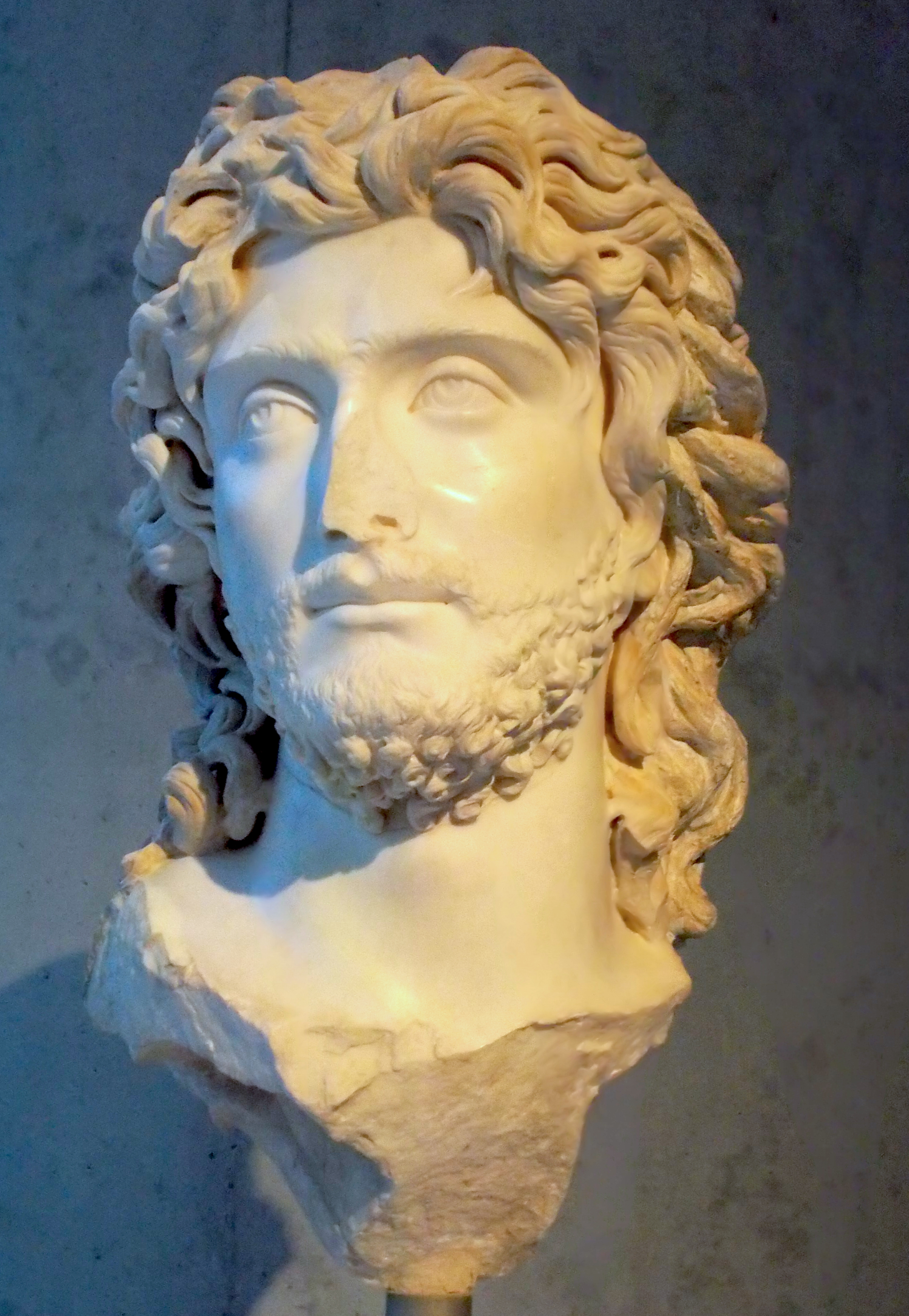
- Marble bust of Sauromates II, Acropolis Museum

King of the Bosporus
- Reign: 172–210
- Predecessor: T. J. Eupator
- Successor: T. J. Rhescuporis III
- Born: Bosporan Kingdom
- Died: 210 (?); Bosporan Kingdom
- Issue: T. J. Rhescuporis III
Names
- Tiberius Julius Sauromates Philocaesar Philoromaios Eusebes
- House: Tiberian-Julian dynasty
- Father: T. J. Rhoemetalces
- Religion: Greek Polytheism

Tiberius Julius Sauromates II Philocaesar Philoromaios Eusebes, also known as Sauromates II (Greek: Τιβέριος Ἰούλιος Σαυρομάτης Β΄ Φιλοκαῖσαρ Φιλορωμαῖος Eὐσεβής, Philocaesar Philoromaios Eusebes, the epithets meaning "friend of Caesar, friend of Rome, pious one") was a Roman client king of the Bosporan Kingdom. His coins are known from the period 172–210, probably accounting for his entire reign.

== Lineage ==
Tiberius Julius Sauromates II is known from inscriptions to have been the son of the Bosporan king Rhoemetalces. Sauromates II's predecessor Eupator might have been his uncle.

Although his surname "Sauromates" indicates alleged Sarmatian ancestry by marriages to Sarmatian princesses, this does not necessarily mean those who bore the title were actual Sarmatians. His Bosporan royal dynasty had been established in the 1st century AD by Tiberius Julius Aspurgus and his son Mithridates (i.e. the son and grandson, respectively, of Bosporan ruler Asander and his queen Dynamis). Aspurgus and Mithridates were not only related to the ruling house of Thrace, but were also descendants of both Mithridates VI Eupator of Pontus (both a Persian and Seleucid-Greek by lineage) and the Roman triumvir Mark Antony through Antonia Tryphaena, Queen of Thrace and her mother Pythodorida of Pontus.

== Life ==
Eupator died at some point between 170 and 172 and Sauromates II succeeded him as Bosporan King, reigning from that date until his death in 210/211. He expressed his royal title in Greek on his coinage: ΒΑΣΙΛΕΩΣ ΣΑΥΡΟΜΑΤΟΥ or of King Sauromates. He was a contemporary of the Roman Emperors Marcus Aurelius, Commodus, Pertinax, Didius Julianus, Septimius Severus and Caracalla.

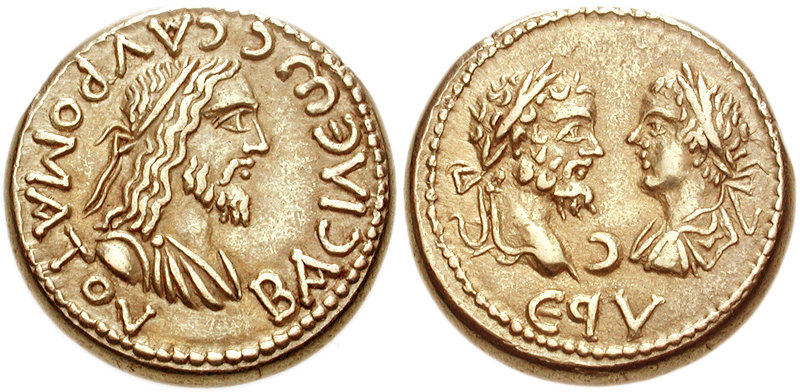
Gold stater of Sauromates II. Obv: head of Sauromates II, legend: BACΙΛΕΩC CΑΥΡΟΜΑΤΟΥ. Rev: heads of Septimius Severus and Caracalla, year YqE' = 495 = 198/199.

Little is known of the life and reign of Sauromates II. According to surviving coinage, he appeared to be a religious person who was involved in the worship of the Goddess Aphrodite and her cult. In 193, Sauromates II finished a military campaign against the Scythians and Sirachi tribes, and successfully defeated them. These victories are known from an inscription found in Tanais, dedicating and celebrating the King's military victories. This military campaign perhaps began in 186, when it spurred a financial crisis within the Bosporan Kingdom. In order to improve the flagging economy of his kingdom, Sauromates II initiated a series of monetary reforms in 186 that, over the course of a decade, gradually reduced the weight of his bronze coinage while increasing the circulation of the golden stater. In the last decade of the 2nd century AD, the coins of Sauromates II also commonly featured the portrait of Septimius Severus; it is not known whether or not this was a command given by the Roman emperor to his client or if the Bosporan king did this on his own volition.

The name of Sauromates' wife is not preserved. They had at least one son, Rhescuporis III, who succeeded Sauromates II in 210/211.

== See also ==
- Bosporan Kingdom
- List of kings of Cimmerian Bosporus
- Roman Crimea
- Tanais Tablets

Preceded by Eupator	King of the Bosporus; 172–210	Succeeded by Rhescuporis III
