= Polemon II of Pontus =

Polemon II
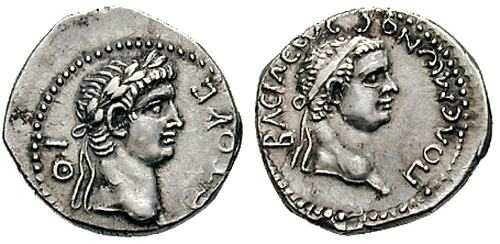
- Silver drachm of king Polemon II (left) and emperor Nero (right), dating from Polemon's regnal year 19.

King of Pontus
- Reign: 38–62 AD (24 years)
- Predecessor: Pythodorida of Pontus as Queen
- Born: 11 / 12 BC
- Died: 74 AD
- Spouse: Berenice (daughter of Herod Agrippa); Julia Mamaea
- Dynasty: Mithridatic
- Father: Polemon I of Pontus
- Mother: Pythodorida of Pontus

Marcus Antonius Polemon Pythodoros, also known as Polemon II of Pontus and Polemon of Cilicia (Greek: Μάρκος Ἀντώνιος Πολέμων Πυθόδωρος; 12 BC/11 BC–74), was a prince of the Bosporan, Pontus, Cilicia, and Cappadocia. He served as a Roman client king of Pontus, Colchis, and Cilicia.

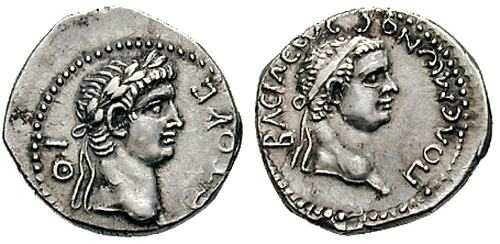
Silver drachm of king Polemon II (left) and emperor Nero (right), dating from Polemon's regnal year 19 (ιθ to the lower left of Polemon's bust), that is 56/57 AD. Caption: ETOYC ΙΘ΄ / ΒΑϹΙΛΕΩϹ ΠΟΛΕΜΩΝΟC.

== Family ==
The Pontic royal family was of mixed Anatolian, Greek, and Roman origin. His paternal grandmother is unknown; however his paternal grandmother could have been named Tryphaena, while his paternal grandfather was Zenon, a prominent orator, aristocrat, and ally to Roman Triumvir Mark Antony. His maternal grandparents were Pythodoros of Tralles, a wealthy Greek and friend of Pompey, and Antonia. Polemon II was the namesake of his parents and his maternal grandparents.

Polemon II was the second son and middle child of the Pontic Rulers Polemon Pythodoros and Pythodorida of Pontus. His eldest brother was Zenon, also known as Artaxias III, who was Roman Client King of Armenia. His youngest sister was Antonia Tryphaena, who was married to Cotys VIII, King of Thrace.

Through his maternal grandmother he was a direct descendant of Mark Antony and his second wife, Antonia Hybrida Minor. Antony and Antonia Hybrida were first paternal cousins. He was Antony's second born great-grandson and great-grandchild.

Polemon II is the only known male descendant of Mark Antony that carries his name. The other male descendant of Mark Antony who carries a form of his name, Antonius, was the consul Quintus Haterius Antoninus. Through Antony, his great maternal aunt was Queen Cleopatra Selene II of Mauretania. Through Antony, he was a distant cousin to Roman Client King Ptolemy of Mauretania. Through Antony, he was also a distant cousin to Roman emperors Caligula, Claudius, and Nero, and Roman empresses Valeria Messalina, Agrippina the Younger, and Claudia Octavia.

The Sophist Polemon of Laodicea was his grandson.

== Reign ==
Polemon II's father died in 8 BC. His mother then married King Archelaus of Cappadocia, and the family had moved to Cappadocia, where Polemon II and his siblings were raised at the court of their stepfather. Archelaus died in 17, whereupon Polemon II and his mother moved back to Pontus. From 17 until 38, Polemon II lived as a private citizen in Pontus and assisted his mother in the administration of their realm. When his mother died in 38, Polemon II succeeded his mother as the sole ruler of Pontus, Colchis and Cilicia.

According to an honorary inscription at Cyzicus in 38, Polemon II participated in celebrating the local games in the city, honoring Julia Drusilla, the late sister of Caligula; in this way Polemon II expressed his loyalty to the emperor and the Roman state. With another Roman Client King, Antiochus IV of Commagene, Polemon II held athletic games in honor of Claudius in Cilicia in 47. Antiochus IV with Polemon II had shown favor towards Claudius, in which they offered significant services to him.

He was forced to abdicate the Pontic throne by Nero in 62 AD.

== Marriages ==
Around 50, Polemon II was attracted to the wealth and beauty of the Judean princess Julia Berenice, whom he had met in Tiberias during a visit to King Herod Agrippa I. Berenice in turn wanted to marry Polemon II to end rumors that she and her brother were committing incest. Berenice had become a widow in 48 when her second husband, her paternal uncle Herod of Chalcis, died. She had two sons by him, Berenicianus and Hyrcanus. Berenice set the condition that Polemon II had to convert to Judaism, which included undergoing the rite of circumcision, before marriage. Polemon II assented, and the marriage went ahead. It did not last long, however, and Berenice left Pontus with her sons and returned to the court of her brother. Polemon II abandoned Judaism and, according to the legend of Bartholomew the Apostle, he converted to Christianity, only to become a pagan again.

At an unknown date, perhaps after the early 50s, Polemon II married a princess called Julia Mamaea, who was from the Syrian Roman Client Emesene Kingdom. Mamaea was of Assyrian, Armenian, Greek, and Median ancestry. Polemon II married Mamaea as his second wife, and the circumstances that lead Polemon II to marry her are unknown. Through Mamaea's marriage to him, she became a Roman Client Queen of Pontus, Colchis, and Cilicia.

The relationship between Polemon II and Mamaea is unknown. Her name and identity is revealed from surviving bronze coinage. Surviving coinage that was issued from Polemon II and Mamaea is extremely rare, as only three specimens are known. These coins show her royal title in Greek, ΙΟΥΛΙΑΣ ΜΑΜΑΙΑΣ ΒΑΣΙΛΙΣΣΗΣ (of Julia Mamaea the Queen) or ΒΑΣΙΛΙΣΣΗΣ ΙΟΥΛΙΑΣ ΜΑΜΑΙΑΣ (of Queen Julia Mamaea). These coins can be dated from the second half of Polemon II's reign from 60 until 74.

Mamea may have bore Polemon II two sons, Polemon and Rhoemetalces Philocaesar, according to a fragmentary inscription from Amphipolis, Greece. His paternal grandson was the sophist Marcus Antonius Polemon.

Polemon II renamed the town Fanizan after himself. He changed the name to Polemonium (modern Fatsa, Turkey).

In 62, Nero induced Polemon II to abdicate the Pontic throne, and Pontus, including Colchis, became a Roman province. From then until his death, Polemon II only ruled Cilicia.

== Legacy ==
He is held to be the progenitor of the Lithuanian nobility (via Palemonids) in its origin theory.

== Sources ==
- Josephus, Antiquities of the Jews XX.7.3
- Josephus, Antiquities of the Jews XIX.8.1
- Hildegard Temporini & W. Haase, Aufstieg und Niedergang der römischen Welt: Principat, Walter de Gruyter, 1980
- Hildegard Temporini & W. Haase, Politische Geschichte (Provinzen und Randvölker: Griechischer Balkanraum; Kleinasien). Griechischer Balkanraum; Kleinasien), Walter de Gruyter, 1980
- A.R. Birley, Septimius Severus. The African Emperor, Routledge, 2002
- B. Levick, Julia Domna. Syrian Empress, Routledge, 2007
- Polemon II article at Ancient Library
- Ptolemaic Genealogy: Cleopatra VII

Regnal titles
Preceded by Pythodorida	King of Pontus; 38–62	Extinct
