= Polemon I of Pontus =

King of Pontus from 36 BC to 8 BC

King of Pontus
- Reign: 37/36 – 8 BC
- Predecessor: Arsaces of Pontus
- Successor: Pythodorida of Pontus

King of the Bosporan Kingdom
- Reign: 16 – 8 BC or 14–8 BC
- Predecessor: Scribonius
- Successor: Dynamis
- Co-ruler: Dynamis (14–13 BC)
- Died: 8 BC
- Spouse: Dynamis; Pythodorida of Pontus
- Issue: Artaxias III; Polemon II of Pontus; Antonia Tryphaena (all with Pythodorida)
- Father: Zenon
- Military career
- Allegiance: Roman Republic
- Years: 36 BC
- Conflicts: Antony's Parthian War; Battle of Praaspa (POW)

Polemon I Pythodoros (Ancient Greek: Πολέμων Πυθόδωρος; fl. 1st century BC – 8 BC) was the Roman Client King of Cilicia, Pontus, Colchis and the Bosporan Kingdom. Polemon was the son and heir of Zenon and possibly Tryphaena. Zenon and Polemon adorned Laodicea with many dedicated offerings.

== Life and career ==
Polemon was Anatolian Greek. Polemon's father, Zenon, was an orator and a prominent aristocrat from Laodicea on the Lycus in Anatolia. Zenon supported Hybreas, an orator and prominent politician in Mylasa (the chief city of Caria). Hybreas got into trouble with the Roman general Quintus Labienus for making a sarcastic comment. Labienus marched on Mylasa. Many of its citizens were inclined to surrender. However, Zenon and Hybreas refused to yield and led their cities into a revolt. Zenon encouraged the locals to resist Labienus and King Pacorus I of Parthia, when their armies invaded Syria and Anatolia in 40 BC. Labienus sacked Mylasa. He 'shamefully maltreated' the home of Hybreas. Zenon was a friend and ally of Roman Triumvir Mark Antony and played a leading role during the Parthian invasion.

According to Appian, Mark Antony established client kings in the eastern areas of the Roman Empire, which were under his control, on condition that they paid a tribute. In Anatolia Polemon was appointed to part of Cilicia, Darius, the son of Pharnaces II and grandson of Mithridates VI, to Pontus, and Amyntas to Pisidia. This was in 37 BC, before his war with Parthia, when he was making preparations for it and before he wintered in Athens in the winter of 37/36 BC.

According to Cassius Dio, in 36 BC Polemon took part in Mark Antony's campaign against Parthia. He was in a detachment led by Oppius Statianus which was attacked and slaughtered by the Parthians and the Medians. Polemon was the only one who was not killed. He was captured and then released for a ransom. In that year, after his defeat in his war against Parthia, Mark Antony 'assigned principalities.' He gave Amyntas Galatia and added Lycaonia and parts of Pamphylia to his domain. He gave Cappadocia to Archelaus after driving out Ariarathes. In 35 BC he wanted to conduct a campaign against Artavasdes II, the king of Armenia. He sent Polemon to Artavasdes, the king of Media Atropatene to try to obtain an alliance with him. This was successful, and in 31 BC, when the agreement was finalised, Antony gave Polemon Lesser Armenia as a reward.

In 26 BC, Polemon, whom Cassius Dio described as the king of Pontus, “was enrolled among the friends and allies of the Roman people; and the privilege was granted the senators of occupying the front seats in all the theatres of his realm.”

Strabo gave an indication of how Polemon might have become a king of Pontus. He wrote Polemon and Lycomedes of Comana attacked Arsaces, one of the sons of Pharnaces II of Pontus, in Sagylium because he “was playing the dynast and attempting a revolution without permission from any of the prefects …” This stronghold was seized, but Arsaces fled to the mountains where he starved because he was without provisions and without water. Pompey had ordered the wells to be obstructed by rocks to prevent robbers from hiding on the mountains. Arsaces was captured and killed. Arsaces probably claimed the throne because he was the grandson of Mithridates VI of Pontus, the last king of an independent Kingdom of Pontus. Sagylium was in the interior of Pontus, not far from Cappadocia and from Comana in Cappadocia, which was ruled by Lycomedes. Polemon must have assumed a royal title in Pontus due to the part he played in suppressing Arsaces. In a later passage, Cassius Dio, specified that Polemon was “the king of that part of Pontus bordering on Cappadocia …” (see below). Therefore, Pontus must have been assigned to several client kings who administered the various regions of Pontus.

Plutarch listed Polemon among the eleven subject kings who sent troops to support Mark Antony in the Battle of Actium in his battle with Octavian in 31 BC. Polemon was among the five kings who did not participate in the battle personally.

In a further episode involving Polemon, Cassius Dio, referred to Polemon as "the king of that part of Pontus bordering on Cappadocia.” Marcus Vipsanius Agrippa sent Polemon against a certain Scribonius who claimed to be a grandson of Mithridates VI and that he had received the Bosporan Kingdom from Augustus after the death of its king, Asander. He married Asander's wife, Dynamis, the daughter of Pharnaces II, who had been entrusted with the regency of the kingdom by her husband. Thus, Scribonius controlled this kingdom. When Polemon reached the Cimmerian Bosporus, Scribonius had been killed by the people, who had heard of his advance. They resisted Polemon because they were afraid that he might be appointed as their king. Polemon defeated them but was unable to quell the rebellion until Agrippa went to Sinope to prepare a campaign against them. They surrendered. Polemon was appointed as their king. He married Dynamis with the support of Augustus.

The date of Polemon's death is unknown. An inscription indicates that he must have been still on the throne as late 2 BC. Or he died about 8 BC.

Strabo wrote that Tanais, a Greek city in the Maeotian Swamp, was sacked by Polemon because “it would not obey him.” Polemon conquered Colchis. He attacked the Aspurgiani, a Maeotian people, under a pretence of friendship, but they defeated him, took him alive and killed him. Strabo also wrote that after Polemon's death “his [second] wife Pythodorida of Pontus [was] in power, being queen, not only of the Colchians, but also of Trapezus and Pharnacia and of the barbarians who live above these places …”

== Marriages and succession ==
Through his first wife, Dynamis, Polemon became stepfather to Tiberius Julius Aspurgus, her son from her first marriage. It seems that after the death of Polemon she regained the Bosporan kingdom and she appears to have ruled until 7-8 AD. Or Dynamis died in 14 BC.

Polemon remarried. His second wife, Pythodorida of Pontus, was a half Anatolian Greek and Roman noblewoman. She was the first grandchild of Antony. Strabo wrote that she was the daughter of Pythodorus of Tralles and gave some information about the two sons and the daughter of Polemon and Pythodorida. They were:

- Zenon, also known as Zeno-Artaxias or Artaxias III, who became King of Greater Armenia in 18 AD and reigned until his death in 35 AD. He was appointed by Germanicus because the throne was vacant and he had popular support as he had imitated Armenian customs from an early age. He was saluted as Artaxias, after Artaxata, the capital of the kingdom.
- Marcus Antonius Polemon Pythodoros, also known as Polemon II of Pontus. Strabo wrote that "as a private citizen is assisting his mother in the administration of her empire."
- Antonia Tryphaena who married Cotys VIII, King of Thrace. Cotys was murdered "and she lived in widowhood, because she had children by him; and the eldest of these [was] in power" at the time of Strabo.

Pythodorida succeeded Polemon and ruled Tibareni and Chaldia, extending as far as Colchis. She also ruled Pharnacia and Trapezus (modern Trabzon). Strabo described her as "a woman who is wise and qualified to preside over affairs of state." She married Archelaus of Cappadocia until his death. She was still ruling at the time of Strabo and "in possession of not only of the places above mentioned, but also of others still more charming." She possessed the cities of Sidene and Themiscyra Phanaroea, close to Pharnacia, the area between the rivers Lycus (Kelkit) and Iris (Yeşilırmak), which included the cities of Magnopolis, Amaseia, and Cabeira (which Pompey had renamed Diospolis), Kainon Chorion, plus Zelitis and Megalopolitis. Pythodoris changed the name of Diospolis to Sebaste, embellished it and used it as a royal residence.

== Family tree of Polemon I ==
Mark Antony triumvir ∞ 2.Antonia Hybrida
Pharnaces II king of C. Bosporus; 63-47 BC	Zenon ∞ Tryphaena (?)	Pythodoros of Tralles wealthy Greek	Antonia
Asander king of C. Bosporus; 47-17 BC ∞ Dynamis	Dynamis queen of C. Bosporus; 16-8 BC ∞ 1.Asander; 2.Scribonius; 3.Polemon I	Polemon I king of Pontus, Cappadocia; 37-8 BC ∞ 1.Dynamis; 2.Pythodoris	Pythodoris queen of Pontus; 8 BC-28 AD ∞ 1.Polemon I of Pontus; 2.Archelaus of Cappadocia	Archelaus king of Cappadocia
T. J. Aspurgus king of C. Bosporus; 8 BC-38 AD ∞ Gepaepyris	Zenon/Artaxias III king of Armenia; 18-34	J. Berenice daughter of Herod Agrippa I king of Judea	Polemon II king of Pontus, Cappadocia; 38-64	J. Mamaea daughter of Sampsigeramus II priest-king of Emessa	Antonia Tryphaena ∞ Cotys III king of Thrace; 12-19
T. J. Mithridates king of C. Bosporus; 38-45	T. J. Cotys I prince

== See also ==
- Bosporan Kingdom
- Roman Crimea

== Notes ==
Preceded by Arsaces of Pontus	King of Pontus; 36–8 BC	Succeeded by Pythodorida
Preceded by Scribonius	King of the Bosporus; 16-8 BC (with Dynamis 16-14 BC)	Succeeded by Dynamis
