= Eunice (Bosporan queen) =

1st-century Roman client queen of the Bosporan Kingdom

Eunice (Greek: Eὐνείκη; fl. 1st century – after 69) (also Eunike) was the queen of the Bosporan Kingdom by marriage to King Cotys I. She appears to have been regent during the minority of her son Rhescuporis I in 68–69.

== Life ==
=== Queen ===
Eunice was a Greek noblewoman of obscure origins. At an unknown date in the reign of Cotys I, 45–63, he married Eunice as his Queen. Cotys I was a monarch of Greek, Iranian and Roman ancestry. He was the second son born to the Bosporan Roman Client Monarchs Aspurgus and Gepaepyris, while his eldest brother was the former Bosporan King Mithridates.

Eunice and Cotys I had a son and successor, Rhescuporis I. The name Rhescuporis, is a name of Thracian origin and is a name that appears in the family of her mother-in-law.

She is not mentioned in ancient Roman historical sources. Eunice is only known through surviving inscriptions and numismatic evidence. In the year 1910, a Greek inscription was found on a marble plate in the wall of a house in Anapa, Russia. Anapa was the ancient Greek city of Gorgippia. In the upper left corner of the marble plate appeared the below inscription. This inscription is dated from the reign of her son Rhescuporis I (68–90) (Corpus Regni Inscriptionum Bospor CIRB 1118):

[Τὸ]ν ἐκ προγόνων βα[σιλέων βασιλέα μέγαν] Τιβέριον Ίούλιον Ῥη[σκούποριν, βασιλέως Κότυ]oς καὶ βασιλίσσης Eὐν[είκης] υἱόν…
The descendant of the Kings, great King Tiberius Julius Rhescuporis, son of King Cotys and of Queen Eunice ...

Eunice's name has also appeared in surviving bronze coinage from the Bosporan Kingdom. On coins on one side appears the Greek legend, ΚΑ-ΠΕ appears with a temple with five steps. On the other side of coins, appears with an enclosing wreath with the Greek abbreviations ΒΑΚ, ΒΑΕΥ, ΒΑΕΙΥ and with the trade denomination ΚΔ. ΚΑ-ΠΕ can be read as ΚΑΠΕ[τολιών]. BAK is the royal abbreviations of Cotys I in Greek: BA[σιλέως] K[ότυος], of King Cotys, while ΒΑΕΥ and ΒΑΕΙΥ are the royal abbreviations for Eunice in Greek: BA[σιλίδος] E[ὐνείκης], of Queen Eunice. No other coins from the Bosporan bear these abbreviations. These coins can be dated from the reigns of Coyts I and Rhescuporis I.

=== Later life and regency ===
These coins reveal the political situation of the Bosporan Kingdom in the mid-1st century. In 63 for unknown reasons, the Roman Emperor Nero disposed Cotys I from his throne and his fate afterwards is unknown. The Bosporan Kingdom was incorporated as a part of the Roman Province of Moesia Inferior from 63 to 68. Perhaps Nero wanted to minimise the role, power and influence of local client rulers and desired the Bosporan to be completely governed by the Roman state.

In June 68, Nero had died and Galba succeeded as Roman Emperor. The coinage clearly portrays the successful attempt of Rhescuporis I to restore the Bosporan Kingdom as a semi-independent Roman Client Kingdom. Cotys I had died by that time, Rhescuporis I had his throne and his kingdom restored to him.

The surviving coinage and inscriptions reveal clues about Eunice. Eunice appears to have been a religious queen, who seems to be a woman of strong, virtuous character. She helped her son in restoration of the Bosporan Kingdom and acting as a regent at least in the first year of her son's rule. Eunice proved to be a capable ruling monarch in the Bosporan flourishing again.

== See also ==
- Roman Crimea

== Sources ==
- Tiberius Julius Cotys I King of Bosphorus
