= Gepaepyris =

Thracian princess, and a Roman Client Queen of the Bosporan Kingdom

Gepaepyris (Greek: Γηπαίπυρις, flourished 1st century) was a Thracian princess, and a Roman Client Queen of the Bosporan Kingdom, the longest known surviving Roman Client Kingdom. She ruled in AD 37/38–39.

== Life ==
Gepaepyris was the first daughter and was among the children of Roman Client Rulers of Thrace, Cotys III and Antonia Tryphaena. Her maternal grandparents were Polemon Pythodoros and Pythodorida of Pontus, while her paternal grandparents were Rhoemetalces I and Pythodoris I of Thrace. Her maternal grandmother was the first grandchild of Roman Triumvir Mark Antony. Gepaepyris was related to various members of the Julio-Claudian dynasty. Gepaepyris was of Persian, Greek and Roman descent.

Gepaepyris is not mentioned by any ancient literary sources. What is known of this Thracian princess has come from surviving inscriptions from the Bosporan Kingdom, the ancient Greek city of Cyzicus (modern Turkey) and numismatic evidence. Cyzicus became the second residence for her family, where Gepaepyris grew up. From coins we know, her royal title was Queen Gepaepyris.

Little is known on the life of Gepaepyris. She married the Roman Client King of the Bosporan Kingdom, Tiberius Julius Aspurgus, who was of Greek and Iranian ancestry. Aspurgus was the son of Bosporan Queen Dynamis from her first marriage to General and Bosporan King Asander.

Gepaepyris seems to have been the only child from the family of Cotys VIII and Antonia Tryphaena to have children. Gepaepyris bore Aspurgus two sons:

- Tiberius Julius Mithridates - he was named in honor of Mithridates VI of Pontus, and died in 68.
- Tiberius Julius Cotys I - he was named in honor of his late maternal grandfather, Cotys VIII.

Through Cotys I, Gepaepyris and Aspurgus had various descendants ruling the Bosporan Kingdom until the mid-4th century. These included descendants that bore Thracian ancestral monarch names such as Cotys, Rhoemetalces and Rhescuporis.

Aspurgus headed the Bosporan domain until his death in 37 or 38. On his death Aspurgus left his wife Gepaepyris, and two sons, Mithridates and Cotys. Gepaepyris succeeded her husband as sole ruler. Coins of Gepaepyris prove her sole rule in Bosporus. There is no mention of Mithridates, and Gepaepyris herself is represented on the obverse as a ruler in full authority. In AD 39 Mithridates inherited the throne of his mother.

== See also ==
- Bosporan Kingdom
- Roman Crimea

== Sources ==
- https://www.wildwinds.com/coins/greece/bosporos/kings/i.html
- https://www.guide2womenleaders.com/womeninpower/Womeninpower01.htm
- https://web.archive.org/web/20160304001107/http://www.tyndalehouse.com/Egypt/ptolemies/cleopatra_vii_fr.htm
- H. Temporini & W. Haase, Aufstieg und Niedergang der römischen Welt: Geschichte und Kultur Roms im Spiegel der neueren Forschung, Walter de Gruyter, 1980

Preceded by Aspurgus	Queen regnant of the Bosporus; 37/38-39	Succeeded by Mithridates III
