= Scribonius (Bosporan usurper) =

Claiment to the throne of the Bosporan Kingdom

Scribonius (died 14 BC) was a man of unknown origin, possibly Roman or Hellenistic. He claimed to be a descendant of Mithridates VI of Pontus, the earlier king of Pontus who had also ruled the Bosporus. Through this, he claimed the throne of the Bosporan Kingdom in 17 BC. Asander, the real king of the Bosporus, starved himself because of this. He somehow convinced Asander's wife, Dynamis, to marry him. When Augustus learned of what Scribonius had done, he sent Marcus Vipsanius Agrippa to remove Scribonius. Agrippa then sent Polemon I of Pontus to remove Scribonius and take the throne himself. Scribonius was murdered by the Bosporans, leaving Dynamis as sole ruler of the country. When Polemon took the throne, he married Dynamis to legitimise his claim.

== See also ==
- Scribonia gens

== Sources ==
- The Roman History: The Reign of Augustus
- Encyclopedia of Women in the Ancient World

Preceded by Asander	King of the Bosporus; 17-14 BC	Succeeded by Polemon and Dynamis
