= Tiberius Julius Eupator =

King of the Bosporus from c.154 to c.170

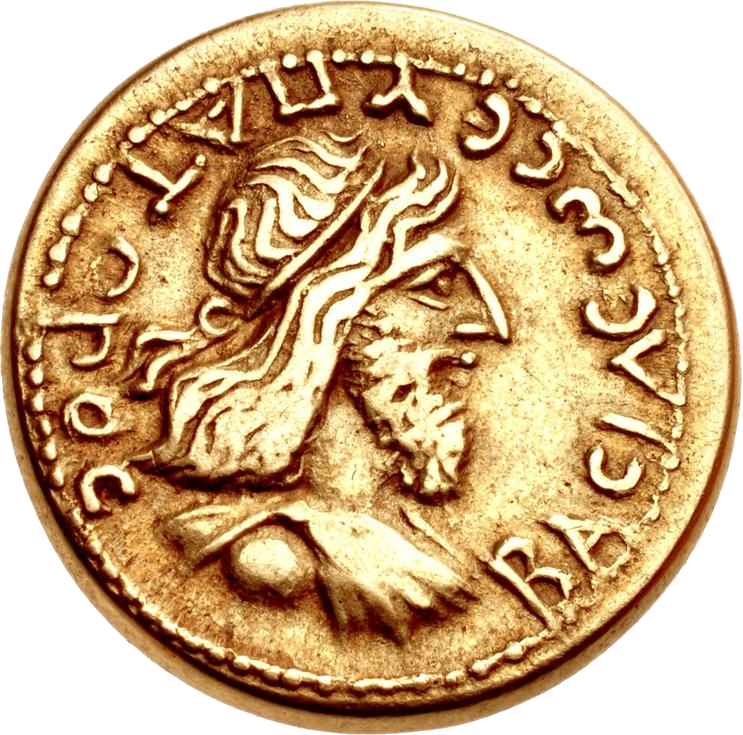
Electrum stater of T. J. Eupator, legend BACΙΛΕΩC ΕΥΠΑΤΟΡΟC. (Rev.: head of Marcus Aurelius, year YΞE' = 465 = 168/9). 18 mm, 7.72 g.

Eupator (Greek: Τιβέριος Ἰούλιος Εὐπάτωρ Φιλοκαῖσαρ Φιλορωμαῖος Eὐσεβής, Tiberios Iulios Eupator Philocaesar Philoromaios Eusebes; fl. 2nd century – c. 170) was a Roman client king of the Bosporan Kingdom. Like many of the late Bosporan kings, Eupator is known mainly from coinage. His coins are known from the period 154–170. His relations to other kings of the Bosporus are unknown; he might have been a son of Cotys II and a brother of his predecessor Rhoemetalces. He was succeeded by Sauromates II, perhaps his nephew, whose coins are first known from the year 172.

Eupator is mentioned in the writings of Lucian (Alexander 57). Lucian had witnessed envoys sent by Eupator to travel to Bithynia to pay the Bosporan Kingdom's yearly tribute to Rome.

== See also ==
- Bosporan Kingdom
- Roman Crimea

Preceded by Rhoemetalces	King of the Bosporus; 154-170	Succeeded by Sauromates II
