= Hildegard Temporini-Gräfin Vitzthum =

German historian of classical antiquity (1939–2004)

Hildegard Temporini-Gräfin Vitzthum (14 March 1939 – 30 November 2004) was a German classical historian and writer, who was well known for her work on the role and influence of women in the early-to-mid Roman Empire. She was also co-editor of Aufstieg und Niedergang der römischen Welt and Historia, two leading ancient history publications.

Born on 14 March 1939, Temporini spent her childhood and adolescence in Frankfurt. Having finished high school in 1958, she began to study Latin, archaeology, ancient history, and art history at that city's university, but on the advice of one of her professors moved to Tübingen in late 1959 to study under Joseph Vogt. She would remain at the University of Tübingen for the rest of her career. She received her doctorate in the winter of 1966/67 after writing a dissertation on the role of women at the royal court during the reign of Trajan; this broke new ground in German-language ancient history, which was not yet accustomed to applying gender studies to the topic. She subsequently researched the regulations of succession in the Roman Empire, attempting to reconcile the differences in the available historical and archaeological material, and for this unpublished work received her habilitation from the university in 1975.

After receiving her doctorate, Temporini began working as an assistant at Tübingen. Promoted first to the position of university lecturer in 1976 and then to adjunct professor the following year, she held the position of associate professor from 1979 until her death in 2004, while continuing her career in active scholarship. Although much of her work centered around her explorations of the role of women in the early-to-mid Roman Empire, Temporini also investigated questions of political thought in antiquity. Her work is characterised by foresighted application of gender-based research, combined with close analysis of not only textual but archaeological and numismatic evidence, showing the great influence Vogt's teachings had on her approach.

During this time, Temporini was the co-editor of two internationally significant publications: the Aufstieg und Niedergang der römischen Welt (ANRW; Rise and Decline of the Roman World in English), and the academic journal Historia. Temporini played a key role in setting up the ANRW, which began in 1972 as a festschrift in honour of her mentor Vogt; she edited the first volumes on her own and was later joined by classical philologist Wolfgang Haase. She also took up a similar position for Historia in 1984, after the departure of Karl Friedrich Stroheker, and edited both publications until her death. In 2002, she additionally edited an anthology of essays titled Die Kaiserinnen Roms: Von Livia bis Theodora ("The Empresses of Rome: From Livia to Theodora"), which became an important handbook for the field.

Temporini, who was married to the lawyer Wolfgang Graf Vitzthum, died on 30 November 2004 after a long and serious illness.
