= Rhoemetalces =

Rhoemetalces may refer to:

== Monarchs ==
- Rhoemetalces I, king of Thrace from 12 BC to 12
- Rhoemetalces II, king of Thrace from 18 to 38
- Rhoemetalces III, king of Thrace from 38 to 46
- Tiberius Julius Rhoemetalces (flourished 2nd century), Roman client king of the Bosporan Kingdom

== Other ==
- Remetalk Point on Livingston Island in the South Shetland Islands, named for Rhoemetalces III

== See also ==
- Odrysian kingdom
