= Rhescuporis III =

King of the Bosporan Kingdom (died 228)

T. J. Rhescuporis III
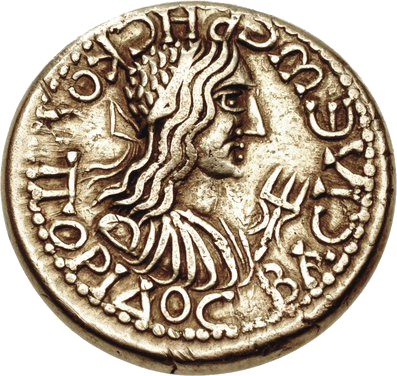
- Electrum stater of Rhescuporis III, legend: ΒΑCΙΛΕΩC ΡΗΣΚΟΥΠΟΡΙΔΟC. (Other side: head of Caracalla, year ΦΙΔ' = 514 = 217/8) 20 mm, 7.49 g.

King of the Bosporus
- Reign: 211 - 228
- Predecessor: T. J. Sauromates II
- Successor: T. J. Cotys III
- Died: 228
- Issue: T. J. Cotys III; T. J. Sauromates III
- Dynasty: Tiberian-Julian
- Father: T. J. Sauromates II

Rhescuporis III (Greek: Τιβέριος Ἰούλιος Ῥησκούπορις Γ' Φιλοκαῖσαρ Φιλορωμαῖος Eὐσεβής, Tiberios Iulios Rheskouporis Philocaesar Philoromaios Eusebes; fl. 3rd century – 228) was a Roman client king of the Bosporan Kingdom. Like many of the other late Bosporan kings, Rhescuporis III is known mainly from coinage, meaning that the historical events of his reign are largely unknown. His coins are known from the period 211–228. He is known from an inscription to have been the son of his predecessor, Sauromates II.

Rhescuporis III is also known from inscriptions to have been the father of his successor, Cotys III, and was perhaps also the father of Sauromates III.

== See also ==
- Bosporan Kingdom
- Roman Crimea

Preceded by Sauromates II	King of the Bosporus; 211-228	Succeeded by Cotys III
