= Tiberius Julius Cotys I =

1st century AD Roman client king of the Bosporan Kingdom

T. J. Cotys I
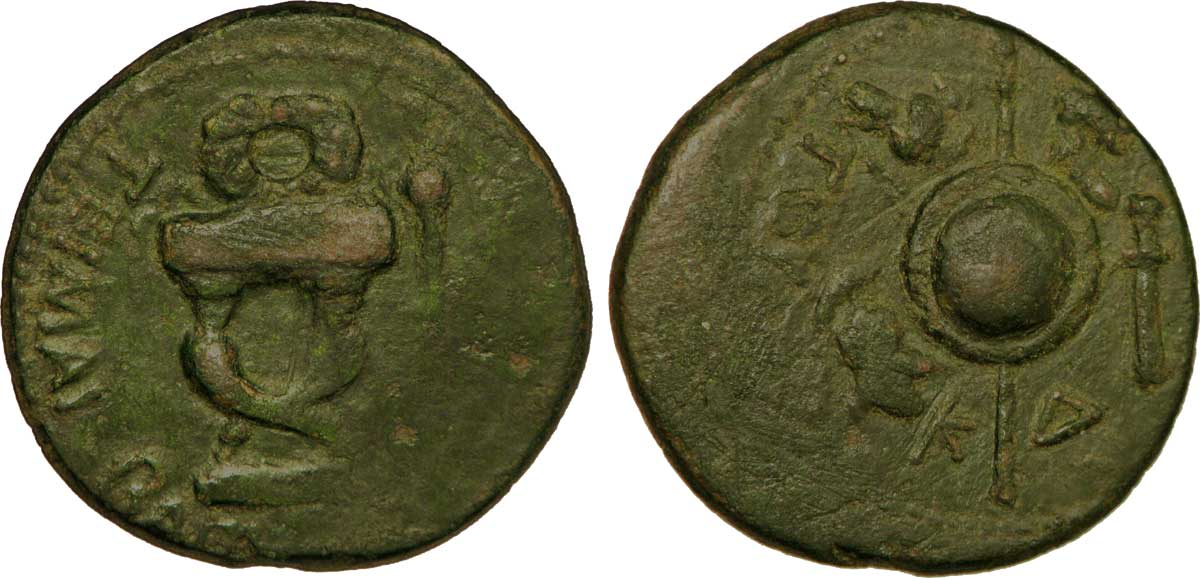
- Tetranummia, reign of Cotys I (50–54 AD). Obv: Curule chair surmounted by crown; a scepter surmounted by a head, leg.: T ΕΙΜΑΙ ΒΑΣ[ΙΛΕΩΣ ΣΚΟΥΤΟΣ]. Rev.: Shield on spear; horse's head (upper left); human head (upper right); helmet (down left); sword (down right); leg.: TOY A[ΣΠΟΥΡΓΟΥ] Κ Δ. Panticaeon, 23.5 mm, 7.45 g

King of the Bosporan Kingdom
- Reign: 45–63 AD
- Predecessor: T. J. Mithridates III
- Successor: T. J. Rhescuporis I
- Died: Unknown
- Consort: Eunice (Bosporan queen)
- Issue: T. J. Rhescuporis I
- House: Tiberian-Julian dynasty
- Father: T. J. Aspurgus
- Mother: Gepaepyris
- Religion: Greek Polytheism

Tiberius Julius Cotys I Philocaesar Philoromaios Eusebes, (Note: Greek: Τιβέριος Ἰούλιος Κότυς Α' Φιλόκαισαρ Φιλορωμαῖος Eὐσεβής Philocaesar Philoromaios Eusebes means "lover of Caesar, lover of Rome who is the pious one" Philopatris means "lover of his country") also known as Cotys I of the Bosporus (fl. 45–63 AD), was a Roman client king of the Bosporan Kingdom.

== Life ==
Cotys I was the second son of Roman client rulers Aspurgus and Gepaepyris. His eldest brother was prince and King Mithridates. He was a prince of Greek, Iranian and Roman ancestry. Cotys I was the second grandson of Bosporan monarchs Asander and Dynamis, and Roman client rulers of Thrace Cotys VIII and Antonia Tryphaena.

Through his maternal grandmother Antonia Tryphaena, he was a descendant of Roman triumvir Mark Antony. Tryphaena was the first great granddaughter born to the triumvir. Through Tryphaena, Cotys I was also related to various members of the Julio-Claudian dynasty. Through Aspurgus, Cotys I was a descendant of the Greek Macedonian Kings: Antigonus I Monophthalmus, Seleucus I Nicator and Regent, Antipater. These three men served under King Alexander the Great. Cotys I was named in honor of his late maternal grandfather, Roman client ruler of Thrace Cotys VIII.

Little is known on the life of Cotys I. Aspurgus headed the Bosporan domain until his death in 37 or 38. Gepaepyris succeeded her husband as sole ruler. In AD 39 Mithridates inherited the throne of his mother. Sometime before 45, the Roman Emperor Claudius gave his brother the whole Bosporan Kingdom to rule. Claudius recognised and appointed Mithridates as the legitimate Bosporan King. In 45, for unknown reasons, Claudius deposed Mithridates from the Bosporan throne and installed Cotys instead. Claudius had withdrawn the Roman garrison under Aulus Didius Gallus from the Bosporan Kingdom and a few Roman cohorts were left with the Roman knight Gaius Julius Aquila in the Bosporan.

Cotys I's brother despised the situation and mistrusted him and Aquila. Mithridates attempted to regain his throne. Mithridates was able to entice the leaders of the local tribes and deserters into becoming his allies. He was able to seize control of the local tribes and collect an army to declare war on Cotys and Aquila.

When Cotys and Aquila heard news of this war, they feared that the invasion was imminent. Both men knew they had the support of Claudius. Mithridates with his army engaged in war with Cotys I's army and Aquila's battalions, in a three-day war, which Cotys I and Aquila won unscathed and triumphant at the Don River.

Mithridates was forced by Claudius to surrender. Mithridates was captured and taken to Rome as a prisoner. He was displayed as a public figure beside the platform in the Roman Forum along with his guards and his expression remained undoubted. Mithridates appealed to the Emperor for mercy to be spared from a triumphal procession or capital punishment. Claudius was impressed with Mithridates’ mercy from his letter and allowed Mithridates to live. He was spared from any capital punishment and was exiled. Cotys I's brother lived as a destitute exiled monarch until his death.

From 45 until 63, Cotys I reigned as Roman client king of the Bosporan Kingdom. Sometime during his reign, Cotys married a Greek noblewoman called Eunice, through whom he had a son called Tiberius Julius Rhescuporis. Cotys named his son after Rhescuporis II, a Thracian prince and king, who was a paternal uncle of his maternal grandfather.

In 63, for unknown reasons, the Roman Emperor Nero deposed Cotys from his throne. The fate of Cotys is thereafter unknown. The Bosporan Kingdom was incorporated as a part of the Roman Province of Moesia Inferior from 63 to 68. In 68, the new Roman Emperor Galba restored the Bosporan Kingdom to Rhescuporis, son of Cotys. Rhescuporis I reigned from 68 until at least 90. Rhescuporis was a contemporary of the ruling Flavian dynasty, in particular the reign of Domitian. Through Rhescuporis, Cotys had descendants occupying the Bosporan throne until the mid-4th century. Among his descendants at least two kings bore his name.

== See also ==
- Bosporan Kingdom
- Cotys
- Roman Crimea

== Sources ==
- Tacitus, Annales, 12.15–21.
- Cassius Dio, 60.8.
- Pliny, Natural History, 6.5.

== Bibliography ==
- "Cotys (7)", William Smith (ed.) Dictionary of Greek and Roman Biography and Mythology. 3. Boston: Little, Brown & Co., 1867.

Preceded by Mithridates	King of the Bosporus; 45–63	Succeeded by Rhescuporis I
