= Mithridates II of the Bosporus =

1st century BCE king of the Bosporus, son of Mithridates the Great

Mithridates II of the Bosporus, also known as Mithridates of Pergamon (died 46 BC), was a nobleman from Anatolia. Mithridates was one of the sons born to King Mithridates VI from his mistress, the Galatian Princess Adobogiona the Elder. He also had a full-blooded sister called Adobogiona the Younger. The Pontic prince was of Persian, Macedonian and Galatian ancestry.

== Early life ==
His father sent Mithridates to Pergamon to be educated, where he became a leading citizen of that city. Mithridates was a tetrarch over the Trocmi tribe.

== Caesar's civil war ==
In the winter of 48-47 BC, Julius Caesar was under siege in Alexandria by the armies of Achillas, guardian and general for King Ptolemy XIII Theos Philopator. Mithridates raised an army and came to Caesar's relief. In the aftermath of the Second Battle of Zela, Caesar made him king of the Bosporan Kingdom. Mithridates's niece Dynamis and her husband Asander were the ruling monarchs at the time, and were defeated by Mithridates's army.

== King of the Bosporus ==
Mithridates reign was short-lived, as Asander defeated him in 47 or 46 BC. Apparently, Mithridates died shortly after that. Sometime between 27 and 17 BC, Augustus formally recognised Asander as king of Bosporus.

== See also ==
- Bosporan Kingdom
- Roman Crimea

== Sources ==
- Mayor, Adrienne: "The Poison King: The Life and Legend of Mithradates, Rome's Deadliest Enemy" Princeton: Princeton University Press, 2009, ISBN 978-0-691-12683-8
