= Tiberius Julius Cotys II =

King of the Bosporus from 123 to 131

T. J. Cotys II
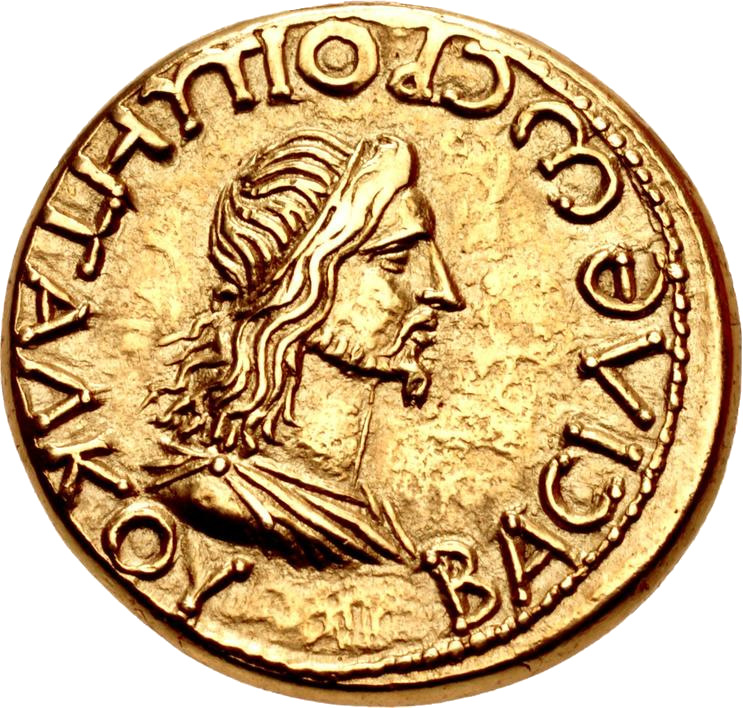
- Gold stater of the Bosporan king Cotys II, legend BACΙΛΕΩC ΡΟΙΜΗΤΑΛΚΟΥ. (Οther side: head of Hadrian, year ΥΚΓ΄ = 423 = 126/7) 19 mm, 7.78 g.

King of the Bosporus
- Reign: 123 - 131
- Predecessor: T. J. Sauromates I
- Successor: T. J. Rhoemetalces
- Died: 131
- Issue: T. J. Rhoemetalces; T. J. Eupator
- Dynasty: Tiberian-Julian
- Father: T. J. Sauromates I

Cotys II or Kotys II (Greek: Τιβέριος Ἰούλιος Κότυς Β' Φιλοκαῖσαρ Φιλορωμαῖος Eὐσεβής, Tiberios Iulios Kotys Philocaesar Philoromaios Eusebes; fl. 2nd century – 131) was a prince and Roman client king of the Bosporan Kingdom. Like many other later Bosporan kings, Cotys II is known mainly from coinage, alongside a few inscriptions and contemporary writings. His coins are known from the period 123–131. Cotys II is known to have been the son of his predecessor Sauromates I. His relationship to later kings is not known for certain, but it is possible that his two immediate successors Rhoemetalces and Eupator were his sons.

During his reign, the city of Chersonesus Taurica was under his direct control. Cotys II is mentioned in the writings of the Roman Historian Arrian and was a contemporary to the rule of the Roman emperor Hadrian.

== See also ==
- Bosporan Kingdom
- Roman Crimea

== Sources ==
- Encyclopedia of ancient Greece By Nigel Guy Wilson Edition: illustrated Published by Routledge, 2006 ISBN 0-415-97334-1, ISBN 978-0-415-97334-2

Preceded by Sauromates I	King of the Bosporus; 123-131	Succeeded by Rhoemetalces
