= Aufstieg und Niedergang der römischen Welt =

Series of books on ancient Roman history

Aufstieg und Niedergang der römischen Welt, commonly referred to by its German acronym, ANRW, or in English as Rise and Decline of the Roman World, is an extensive collection of books dealing with the history and culture of ancient Rome. Akin to a journal and published in various series, each number of the ANRW comprises scholarly essays contributed by individual authors. The essays are in various modern European languages, but are primarily written in German or English.

The series is currently published in its second series (Part 2), the Principat series (that is, relating to the period of the Roman Principate).

== History of the work ==
The series began in 1972, intended as a Festschrift to commemorate the seventy-fifth birthday of Joseph Vogt, a German classicist and historian. Since then, it has grown with time beyond its original remit, and is now more of an encyclopedia, or a serial compendium. The series seeks to treat aspects of the Roman world, as well as their continuation and reception in the Middle Ages and into modernity, providing a guide to current research.

The series is edited by Hildegard Temporini-Gräfin Vitzthum (Parts 1 and 2) and Wolfgang Haase (Part 2), and is published by Walter de Gruyter of Berlin and New York.

== Structure ==
Individual volumes of the ANRW are written like handbooks. More than one thousand scholars have contributed to the series.

Part 1 (Von den Anfängen Roms bis zum Ausgang der Republik), in four volumes, covered topics of the period from the founding of Rome to the end of the Republic. Part 2 (Principat, published since 1974) is concerned with the imperial period. Part 3 (Spätantike), on late antiquity, is in planning. A unified index ("Register") will eventually complete the work.

Each Part is published in multiple volumes, across six systematic sections:

1. Political History;
2. Law;
3. Religion;
4. Language and Literature;
5. Philosophy and the Sciences; and
6. The Arts.

== Published volumes ==
The publication history is complex, with multiple sections published concurrently in Part 2. A list of the published volumes is available through the project's website at the Institute for Classical Studies at Boston University.
