= Tiberius Julius Rhoemetalces =

King of the Bosporus from 131 to 153

T. J. Rhoemetalces
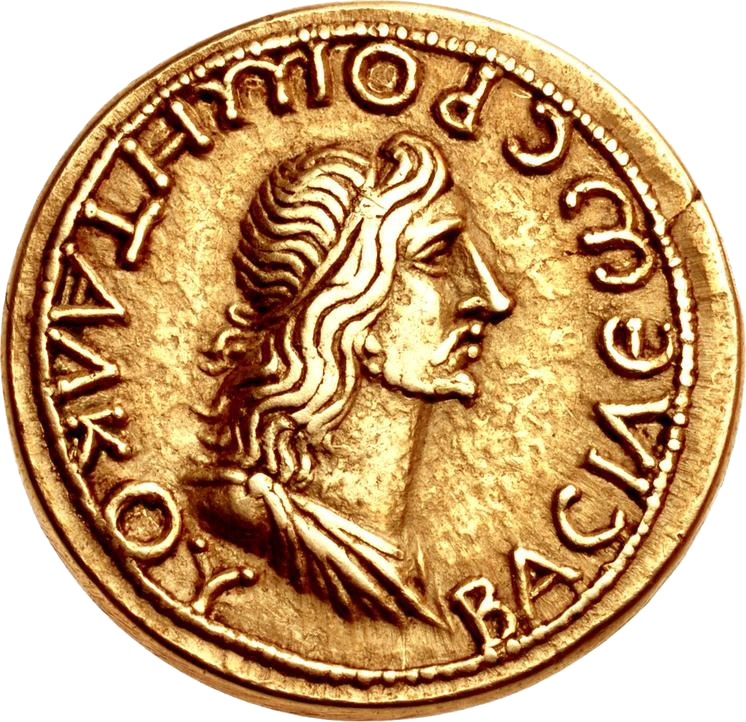
- Gold stater of Rhometalces, legend: BACΙΛΕΩC ΡΟΙΜΗΤΑΛΚΟΥ. (Other side: head of Hadrian, year ΥΛ΄ = 430 = 133/4). 19 mm, 7,78 g.

King of the Bosporus
- Reign: 131–153
- Predecessor: T. J. Cotys II
- Successor: T. J. Eupator
- Died: 153
- Issue: T. J. Sauromates II
- Dynasty: Tiberian-Julian dynasty
- Father: T. J. Cotys II
- Religion: Greek Polytheism

Rhoemetalces, also known as Rhoimetalces (Greek: Τιβέριος Ἰούλιος Ροιμητάλκης; fl. 2nd century – 153) was a Roman client king of the Bosporan Kingdom.

== Life ==
When Cotys II died in 131, Rhoemetalces succeeded him as king. The relationship between Rhoemetalces and previous kings is not known, though it is possible that he was a son of Cotys II. Rhoemetalces ruled as Bosporan king from 131 until 153. He was a contemporary to the rule of the Roman Emperors Hadrian and Antoninus Pius. On coinage, his royal title is in Greek: ΒΑΣΙΛΕΩΣ ΡΟΙΜΗΤΑΛΚΟΥ ("of King Rhoemetalces").

According to the Historia Augusta, at an unknown date in the reign of Antoninus Pius, Rhoemetalces travelled to Rome for a hearing of a dispute between him and the imperial commissioner. The nature and causes leading to this dispute are unknown. After the hearing had concluded, the Emperor sent him back to the Bosporan Kingdom.

Rhoemetalces appears to have been religious and involved in the worship of Aphrodite. This can be confirmed by an inscription found on a statue base from Phanagoria.

Tiberius Julius, king Rhoimetalces, a friend of the Caesar and of the Romans, pious, having gathered and augmented the lands of Thianneoi that were dedicated to by Letodoros, and pelatoi, according to the record on the monument that stands nearby, that decreased with time, restored them safe to the goddess, by the concern of Alexandros, son of Myreimos, the minister of religion, in 448, in the month of Apellaios, 20.

Not much more is known of his reign and life. He was succeeded by Eupator, who might have been his brother. Rhoemetalces is known to have had at least one son, Sauromates II, who succeeded Eupator as king in the 170s.

== See also ==
- Bosporan Kingdom
- Roman Crimea

| Preceded by Cotys II | King of the Bosporus; 131-153 | Succeeded by Eupator |
