= Joseph Vogt =

German historian of classical antiquity (1895–1986)

Joseph Vogt (23 June 1895 in Schechingen – 14 July 1986 in Tübingen) was a German classical historian, one of the leading 20th-century experts on Roman history.

Following his studies at the universities of Tübingen and Berlin, Vogt earned his doctorate in history in 1921 and his Habilitation in 1923. Subsequently he became Professor of Classical History at the University of Tübingen. He was Professor at the universities of Würzburg (1929), Breslau (1936), Tübingen (1940) and Freiburg im Breisgau (1944), before he returned to Tübingen ain 1946 and taught there until his retirement in 1963.

Vogt is well known for his works on the Roman Republic (1932) and the era of Constantine I (1949). In 1950, he led a major research project on slavery in antiquity at the Mainz Academy of Sciences. Vogt joined the Nazi party during the years 1940-1945 and adopted the racial theories in vogue at the time. In this context, he described the history of the Roman world as the result of the struggle between the superior "aryan" Roman race and the "Semitic" Phoenician sub-race. Thus in the preface of his edited volume entitled Rom und Karthago, Vogt states that "Surrounded by races of sailors from Asia Minor, Rome often had to draw its sword to assert its power. The destruction of Carthage was a crucial event in terms of racial history: it preserved the future Western civilization from the miasmas of this Phoenician pest".

The Aufstieg und Niedergang der römischen Welt, an extensive series of scholarly books dealing with the history and culture of Ancient Rome, was started as a Festschrift to Vogt.

== Selected publications ==
- Die römische Republik. Herder, Freiburg 1932; Taschenbuchausgabe Heyne, München 1979, ISBN 3-453-48059-7.
- Constantin der Große und sein Jahrhundert. Münchner Verlag, München 1949 (2., überarb. Aufl. 1960); Taschenbuchausgabe König, München 1973, ISBN 3-8082-0046-4.
- Sklaverei und Humanität im klassischen Griechentum. Steiner, Wiesbaden 1953.

== Literature ==
- Karl Christ: "Joseph Vogt (1895–1986)." In: Karl Christ: Neue Profile der Alten Geschichte. Wiss. Buchgesellschaft, Darmstadt 1989, S. 63–124, ISBN 3-534-10289-4.
- Diemuth Königs: Joseph Vogt. Ein Althistoriker in der Weimarer Republik und im Dritten Reich. Helbing & Lichtenhahn, Basel 1995 (Basler Beiträge zur Geschichtswissenschaft, 168), ISBN 3-7190-1436-3.

== Notes ==
1. J. Vogt, Unsere Fragestellung, in J. Vogt (hrsg.), Rom und Carthago. Ein Gemeinschaftswerk, Leipzig, Koehler & Amelang, 1943, p. 8. See also Z. Yavetz, Slaves and slavery in ancient Rome, New Brunswick, Transaction Publishers, 1988, p. 193 and J. Chapoutot, Comment meurt un Empire: le nazisme, l'Antiquite et le mythe, Revue historique 646/3, 2008, pp. 657–676. For a useful discussion on J. Vogt's past and his theories, see T. A. SCHMITZ, Ex Africa lux? Black Athena and the debate about Afrocentrism in the US, available online http://gfa.gbv.de/dr,gfa,002,1999,a,03.pdf.
