= Tiberius Julius Mithridates =

1st-century AD ruler of the Bosporan Kingdom

Mithridates III
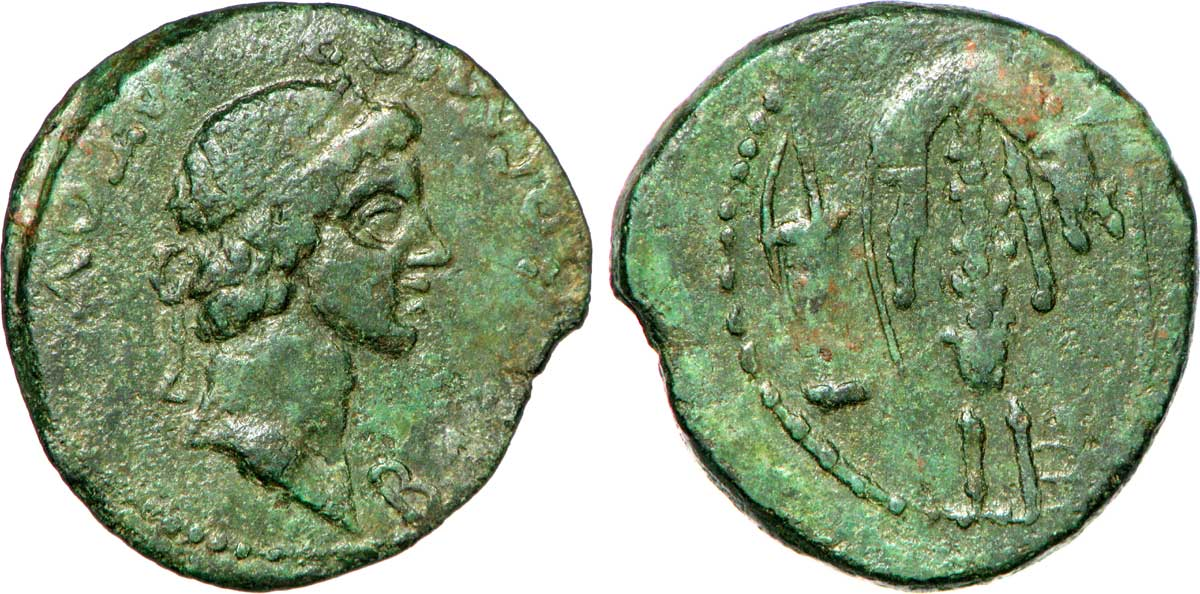
- Copper coin. Obv.: head of Tiv. Jul. Mithridates, legend: BACΙΛΕΩC ΜΙΘΡΙΔΑΤΟΥ. Rev.: Mace, leonte above it, bow and quiver (left), trident (right), IB' = 12 (nummia). 22 mm, 8.47 g.

King of the Bosporan Kingdom
- Reign: 39–44/45 AD
- Predecessor: Gepaepyris (as Queen)
- Successor: Cotys I
- Died: 68 AD
- House: Tiberian-Julian dynasty
- Father: Aspurgus
- Mother: Gepaepyris
- Religion: Greek Polytheism

Tiberius Julius Mithridates Philogermanicus Philopatris, (Note: Greek: Τιβέριος Ιούλιος Μιθριδάτης Φιλογερμανικος Φιλοπατρíς Philopatris means "lover of his country") also known as Mithridates III of the Bosporus (fl. 41 AD, died 68 AD), was a Roman client king of the Bosporus.

== Ancestry ==
Mithridates was the first son of the Roman client king Aspurgus and his consort Gepaepyris. He had a younger brother who would go on to succeed him as Cotys I. He was a prince of Greek, Iranian and Roman ancestry. He was the first grandchild and grandson of Asander and Dynamis of the Bosporus and Cotys VIII and Antonia Tryphaena of Thrace.

Through his maternal grandmother Antonia Tryphaena, he was a descendant of Roman triumvir Mark Antony. Tryphaena was the first great-granddaughter born to Antony. Through Tryphaena, Mithridates was also related to various members of the Julio-Claudian dynasty.

Through Aspurgus, Mithridates was a descendant of the Greek Macedonian kings: Antigonus I Monophthalmus, Seleucus I Nicator and the general and statesman Antipater. These three men served under Alexander the Great. Tiberius Julius Mithridates was named in honour of his ancestor Mithridates VI of Pontus, who was the paternal grandfather of Tiberius Mithridates' grandmother Dynamis.

== Life ==
Little is known on the early life of Mithridates. Aspurgus headed the Bosporan domain until his death in 37 or 38. Gepaepyris succeeded her husband as sole ruler. In AD 39 Mithridates inherited the throne of his mother. Sometime before 45, the Roman Emperor Claudius had given Mithridates the whole Bosporan Kingdom to rule. Claudius recognised and appointed him as the legitimate Bosporan King. In 45, for unknown reasons, Claudius deposed Mithridates from the throne and replaced him with his younger brother Cotys I. Claudius had withdrawn the Roman garrison under Aulus Didius Gallus from the Bosporan Kingdom and a few Roman cohorts were left behind with the eques Gaius Julius Aquila.

Mithridates despised the situation. He mistrusted Cotys I and Aquila, and attempted to regain his throne. Mithridates was able to entice the leaders of the local tribes and deserters into his allies. He was able to seize control of the local tribes and collect an army to declare war on Cotys I and Aquila. When Cotys I and Aquila heard news of this war, they feared that the invasion was imminent. Both men knew they had the support of Claudius. Mithridates with his army, engaged in war with Cotys I's army and Aquila's battalions, in a three-day war, which Cotys I and Aquila won unscathed and triumphant at the Don River.

Mithridates knew that resistance was hopeless and considered an appeal to Claudius. Mithridates turned to a local tribesman called Eunones, to help him. Eunones, sent envoys to Rome to Claudius with a letter from Mithridates.

In Mithridates’ letter to the Emperor, Mithridates greeted and addressed him with great honour and respect from one ruler to another ruler. Mithridates asked Claudius for a pardon and to be spared from a triumphal procession or capital punishment. Claudius wasn't sure how to punish or deal with Mithridates. Mithridates was captured and brought to Rome as a prisoner. He was displayed as a public figure beside the platform in the Roman Forum along with his guards and his expression remained undoubted.

Claudius was impressed with Mithridates' mercy from his letter and allowed him to live. He was spared capital punishment and was exiled. Mithridates lived in exile as a destitute until his death. He had no known wife or children.

== See also ==
- Bosporan Kingdom
- Roman Crimea

== Sources ==
- Tacitus, Annales, 12.15–21.
- Cassius Dio, 60.8.
- Pliny, Natural History, 6.5.

== Bibliography ==
- "Cotys (7)", William Smith (ed.) Dictionary of Greek and Roman Biography and Mythology. 3. Boston: Little, Brown & Co., 1867.
- "Mithridates (9)", William Smith (ed.) Dictionary of Greek and Roman Biography and Mythology. 3. Boston: Little, Brown & Co., 1867.

Preceded by Gepaepyris	King of the Bosporus; 39-44/45	Succeeded by Cotys I
