= Pythodoros of Tralles =

Pythodoros of Tralles, also known as Pythodorus (Ancient Greek: Πυθόδωρος; c. 70 – after 28 BC), was an exceedingly wealthy Greek living in the 1st century BC. Pythodoros originally came from Tralles (modern Aydın, Turkey). Not much is known about his family. He was a friend to the Roman triumvir Pompey.

Pythodoros became the first son-in-law of the Roman triumvir Mark Antony. In 36 BC, Pythodoros had married to one of Antony’s eldest children, his daughter Antonia. Antonia was the daughter and only child from the triumvir’s second marriage to his paternal cousin Antonia Hybrida Minor. His wife was about 20 years younger than he was. The reason that Antony arranged for Pythodoros to marry his daughter was to hopefully gain some of Pythodoros’ wealth for his war chest in his campaign to invade Parthia. However, it is uncertain if Antony ever managed to do this.

Pythodoros and his wife settled in Smyrna (modern İzmir, Turkey). Either in 30 BC or 29 BC, Antonia bore Pythodoros a daughter and only child Pythodorida, who through her marriages became Queen of Pontus and Cappadocia. Pythodorida was born and raised in Smyrna.
