= Antonia (wife of Pythodoros) =

Roman noblewoman

- Born: 50s BC; Rome, Roman Republic
- Died: Smyrna
- Other name: Antonia Prima
- Spouse: Pythodoros of Tralles
- Children: Pythodorida of Pontus
- Parents: Mark Antony (father); Antonia Hybrida Minor (mother)

Antonia (c. 50s BC – ?) was a Roman noblewoman who married the Greek nobleman Pythodoros of Tralles. She has been identified as the daughter of the general Mark Antony, presumably by his second wife Antonia Hybrida Minor. Theodor Mommsen was the first historian to identify Pythodoros' wife as the same woman as the daughter of Antony who was engaged to a son of the triumvir Lepidus. Mommsen's view has found wide acceptance but is not without its detractors.

== Biography ==
=== Early life ===
Her parents were paternal first cousins. Antonia was the eldest known recorded child of Antony and some modern historians consider her to be the first child born to Antony. She was born and raised in Rome. By 47 BC, Antonia's parents had divorced because Antony believed Hybrida had slept with his friend, the tribune Publius Cornelius Dolabella. Within a year her father had married again to Fulvia, and had two sons named Antyllus and Iullus by her.

=== First engagement ===
Antonia's father had arranged for her to be betrothed in 44 BC, to a son of his fellow triumvir Marcus Aemilius Lepidus, whom Antony had secured the position as Pontifex maximus for that same year. Her fiancé is often assumed to have been Lepidus oldest son Marcus Aemilius Lepidus Minor, but a younger son is also possible. (Note: Franklin H. Potter for example believed that the engagement was with Lepidus younger son.) It is unknown if Antonia would have been in the custody of her stepmother Fulvia or if she would have accompanied her father in his travels to the east during this period. In 40 BC Fulvia died after a conflict with Octavian and her father remarried once again, this time to Octavian's sister Octavia Minor. Antonia may have been with Octavia and her younger siblings after this. When Lepidus the triumvir was in Africa (around 37 BC) her father sent a freedman named Callias (Note: Some historians also think Callias may have been sent to Lepidus to discuss how to take advantage of Octavian's situation with Sextus Pompeius at the time.) to tell Lepidus to prepare for Antonia's wedding to take place some time before Antony left for his Parthian campaign. It is likely that the engagement was broken off in 36 BC when Lepidus was disgraced.

The ancient historian Cassius Dio states that Antonia and the young Lepidus were actually married, but most modern historians believe this to have been a mistake on his part, although it is not universally agreed upon, one dissenting opinion is from Nicola Criniti who thinks the two were wed. Before Mommsen's identification of Lepidus Minor's fiancé with Pythodoros wife, it was generally held that this Antonia might have died, either before or after a marriage, since at the time of Lepidus Minor's own death in 30 BC, he was married to another woman named Servilia.

=== Marriage ===
Between 36 and 34 BC, Antonia married Pythodoros of Tralles, who was an Anatolian Greek, who originated from Tralles (modern Aydın, Turkey). He was extremely wealthy and was a friend to the late triumvir Pompey. Pythodoros was about 20 years older than Antonia. The reason why Antony married his daughter off to Pythodoros was to hopefully gain some of Pythodoros' wealth for his war chest in his campaign to invade Parthia. This was a testament to Antony's Eastern perspective, as at that time Antony was married to Ptolemaic Greek Queen Cleopatra VII of Egypt and was living with her at her palace in Alexandria, Egypt.

Antonia's marriage to Pythodoros and her father's motive for the marriage to occur possibly upset the Roman Senate. This may have been one of the reasons that Octavian used in 31 BC to declare war on her father and stepmother Cleopatra. In the following year, her father and stepmother committed suicide when Octavian defeated them and conquered Egypt.

Antonia and Pythodoros settled in Smyrna (modern İzmir, Turkey). Either in 30 BC or 29 BC, Antonia bore Pythodoros, a daughter and only child Pythodorida, who through her marriages became Queen of Pontus and Cappadocia. Pythodorida was born and raised in Smyrna.

== See also ==
- Women in ancient Rome
