= Aspurgus =

Roman client king of the Bosporan Kingdom (ruled 7/8-37/38 AD)

Aspurgus Philoromaios
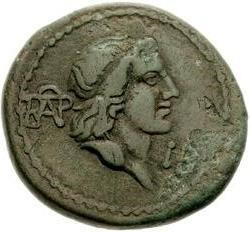

King of the Bosporan Kingdom
- Reign: 7/8 – 37/38 AD
- Predecessor: Dynamis (as queen)
- Successor: Gepaepyris (as queen)
- Died: 37/38 AD
- Issue: T. J. Mithridates; T. J. Cotys I
- House: Tiberian-Julian dynasty
- Father: Asander
- Mother: Dynamis
- Religion: Greek Polytheism

Tiberius Julius Aspurgus Philoromaios (Greek: Τιβέριος Ἰούλιος Ἀσποῦργoς Φιλορωμαῖος, (Note: Philoromaios means "lover of Rome") fl. second half of 1st century BC and first half of 1st century AD; died 37/38) was a prince and Roman client king of the Bosporan Kingdom.

== History ==
The name Aspurgus is of Iranian origin, derived from aspa (horse) and aspabara (horseman).

Aspurgus was born to Asander, ruler of the Bosporan Kingdom and Dynamis. He was the maternal grandchild to the previous Roman client king of the Bosporan and Pontus, Pharnaces II and his Sarmatian wife.

In 17 BC, Asander died of voluntary starvation from despair at the age of 93 because he witnessed his troops desert him for the Roman usurper, Scribonius. Scribonius pretended to be a relative of Dynamis, so he could seize Asander's throne and become king. Dynamis was forced to marry Scribonius. The Roman statesman Marcus Vipsanius Agrippa discovered Scribonius’ deception and intervened, appointing Polemon I of Pontus as the new Bosporan King. Dynamis married Polemon I, making him Aspurgus' stepfather.

When Dynamis died in 7 or 8 C.E., Aspurgus headed the Bosporan domain. Little is known of Aspurgus’ reign. However, he seemed to have been a strong and capable ruler. Due to previous dynastic conflicts during the Roman Republic and around the period of Asander's death, the Emperor Augustus and the Roman Senate only accepted Aspurgus as the legitimate Bosporan King in 14 AD. Aspurgus adopted the Roman names "Tiberius Julius", because he received Roman citizenship and enjoyed the patronage of Augustus and his heir, Tiberius.

== Family ==
Aspurgus married Gepaepyris, a Thracian princess. Gepaepyris bore Aspurgus two sons:

- Tiberius Julius Mithridates, named in honour of Mithridates VI; he died in 68 AD
- Tiberius Julius Cotys I, named in honour of his late maternal grandfather, Cotys VIII

Aspurgus reigned until his death in 37 or 38 AD. On his death Aspurgus left his wife Gepaepyris, and two sons, Mithridates and Cotys. Gepaepyris succeeded her husband as sole ruler.

== Bibliography ==
- "Ancient Coinage of Bosporos, Kings - WildWinds.com". Wildwinds.com.
- "Cleopatra VII". 27 October 2009. Archived from the original on 27 October 2009.
- Mayor, A., The Poison King: the life and legend of Mithradates, Rome's deadliest enemy, Princeton University Press, 2009, ISBN 978-0691150260
- Treister, M., On the weapons of Sarmatian type in the Bosporan Kingdom in the 1st-2nd century AD

== See also ==
- Bosporan Kingdom
- Roman Crimea

Preceded by Dynamis	King of the Bosporus; 7/8–37/38	Succeeded by Gepaepyris
