= Pythodoris of Pontus =

Roman client queen of Pontus (30/29 BC-38 AD)

Pythodoris

Queen regnant of Pontus
- Reign: 8 BC – 38 AD
- Predecessor: Polemon I as King
- Successor: Polemon II as King

Queen consort of Pontus, Bosporus and Cilicia
- Tenure: 13/12 BC – 8 BC

Queen consort of Cappadocia
- Tenure: 8 BC – 17 AD
- Born: 30 BC or 29 BC; Smyrna (modern-day İzmir, Turkey)
- Died: AD 38 (aged 67 or 68); Pontus (modern-day Anatolia, Turkey)
- Spouse: King Polemon I of Pontus; King Archelaus of Cappadocia
- Issue: Artaxias III of Armenia; Polemon II of Pontus; Antonia Tryphaena, Queen of Thrace
- Father: Pythodoros of Tralles
- Mother: Antonia

Pythodoris of Pontus (Ancient Greek: Πυθοδωρίς, 30 BC or 29 BC – 38), also spelled Pythodorida (Πυθοδωρίδα), was a Roman client queen of Pontus, the Bosporan Kingdom, Cilicia, and Cappadocia.

== Origins and early life ==
According to an honorific inscription dedicated to her in Athens in the late 1st century BC, her royal title was Queen Pythodoris Philometor (Greek: ΒΑΣΙΛΙΣΣΑ ΠΥΘΟΔΩΡΙΣ ΦΙΛΟΜΗΤΩΡ). Philometor means "mother-loving" and this title is associated with the Ptolemaic dynasty of Egypt.

Pythodoris was born and raised in Smyrna (modern İzmir, Turkey). She was the daughter and only child of the wealthy Ionian, and friend to the late triumvir Pompey, Pythodoros of Tralles and a woman named Antonia. This Antonia was thought by Theodore Mommsen to be the daughter of Mark Antony, but recent scholarship has revealed the assertion to be problematic. Domitilla Campanile suggests it is more likely the father of this Antonia was the child of Gaius Antonius or Lucius Antonius, brothers of the more famous Marcus.

== Queen ==
The successive marriages of Pythodoris illustrate how elite women, like Rome's client states, were shuffled around in the game of power politics. 13 or 12 BC, Pythodoris married King Polemon Pythodoros of Pontus as his second wife. By this marriage she became Queen of Pontus and the Bosporan Kingdom.

Pythodoris and Polemon had two sons and one daughter, who were:

- Zenon, also known as Zeno-Artaxias or Artaxias III, who became King of Armenia in 18 AD and reigned until his death in 35 AD
- Marcus Antonius Polemon Pythodoros, also known as Polemon II of Pontus
- Antonia Tryphaena who married King of Thrace, Cotys VIII

When her husband Polemon died, Pythodoris was recognized as queen in her own right. Pythodoris was able to retain Colchis and Cilicia but not the Bosporan Kingdom which was granted to her first husband's stepson, Aspurgus. She then married King Archelaus of Cappadocia. Archelaus and Pythodoris had no children. Through her second marriage, she became Queen of Cappadocia. Pythodoris had moved with her children from Pontus to Cappadocia to live with Archelaus. When Archelaus died in 17, Cappadocia became a Roman province and she returned with her family back to Pontus.

In later years, Polemon II assisted his mother in the administration of the kingdom. Following her death, Polemon II succeeded to the throne. Pythodoris was remembered by a friend and contemporary, the Greek geographer Strabo, who is said to have described Pythodoris as a woman of virtuous character. Strabo considered her to have a great capacity for business and that under Pythodoris' rule Pontus had flourished.

== See also ==
- Bosporan Kingdom
- List of Kings of Pontus
- Roman Crimea
