= Asander (king) =

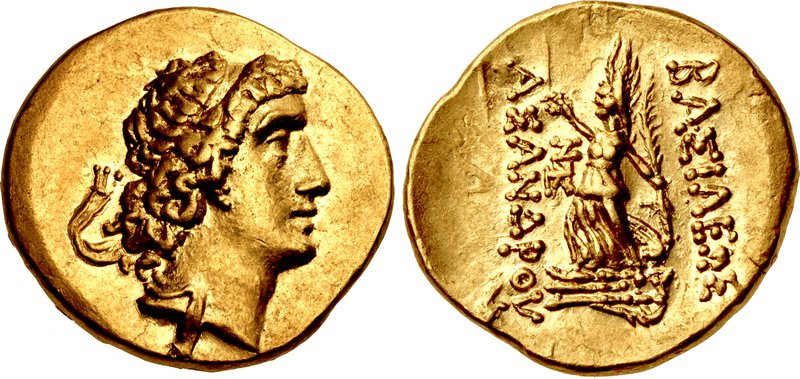
- Gold stater of Asander as King of the Bosporan Kingdom, dated 41/40 BC

King of the Bosporus 1st co-reign with Dynamis
- Reign: 47 BC
- Predecessor: Pharnaces II of Pontus
- Successor: Mithridates II

King of the Bosporus 2nd co-reign with Dynamis
- Reign: 44–17 BC
- Predecessor: Mithridates II
- Successor: Scribonius
- Born: 110 BC
- Died: 17 BC (aged 93)
- Spouse: Dynamis
- Issue: Tiberius Philoromaios
- House: Tiberian-Julian dynasty
- Religion: Greek Polytheism

Asander, named Philocaesar Philoromaios (Greek: Άσανδρoς Φιλοκαισαρ Φιλορώμαίος, (Note: "Asander, lover of Caesar lover of Rome") 110 – 17 BC) was a Roman client king of the Bosporan Kingdom. He was of Greek and possibly of Persian ancestry. Not much is known of his family and early life. He started his career as a general under Pharnaces II, the king of the Bosporus. According to some scholars, Asander took as his first wife a woman called Glykareia, known from one surviving Greek inscription, "Glykareia, wife of Asander".

== Revolt against Pharnaces II ==
By 47 BC, Asander had married Dynamis, the daughter of Pharnaces II by a Sarmatian wife, as his second wife. She was a granddaughter of King Mithridates VI of Pontus by his first wife, his sister Laodice.

In 47 BC, Pharnaces II put Asander in charge of the Bosporan Kingdom while he went with an army to invade the eastern parts of Anatolia. Following a successful campaign, Pharnaces advanced towards the western parts of Anatolia. However, he had to stop because Asander revolted against him. Asander hoped that by betraying his father-in-law he would win favour with the Romans and they could help him become the Bosporan King.

Pharnaces defeated Roman general Gnaeus Domitius Calvinus but was then defeated by Julius Caesar. After this defeat, Pharnaces fled to Sinope with 1,000 cavalry. From Sinope Pharnaces sailed to the Cimmerian Bosporus (without his horses), intending to recover his kingdom from Asander. He captured Theodosia (Feodosia) and Panticapaeum. In response, Asander attacked him. Pharnaces was defeated and killed in the battle because he was short of horses and his men were not used to fighting on foot. Strabo wrote that Asander took possession of the Bosporus.

== Overthrow of Asander ==
Asander was soon overthrown from the Bosporan throne. Julius Caesar gave a tetrarchy in Galatia and the title of king to Mithridates of Pergamon. He also allowed him to wage war against Asander and conquer the Cimmerian Bosporus because Asander "had proved base toward his friend". When Caecilius Bassus plotted a rebellion against Caesar and gathered troops to take over Syria in late 47 BC or early 46 BC, he claimed that "he was collecting these troops for the use of Mithridates the Pergamenian in an expedition against Bosporus". Mithridates of Pergamon overthrew Asander and became Mithridates I of the Bosporus.

== Restoration to Bosporan Kingdom ==
Asander came back to defeat Mithridates in 47/46 BC. Sometime between 27 and 17 BC, Augustus formally recognised Asander as king of Bosporan Kingdom.

According to Strabo, Asander blocked the isthmus of the Chersonesus (Chersonesus Tauricus, modern Crimea) near Lake Maeotis (the Sea of Azov) with a wall which was 360 stadia long ( 53 kilometres, 35 miles) and had ten towers for every stadium. The wall was probably built because the Georgi of the region engaged in piracy. This isthmus was probably the modern Isthmus of Perekop.

Lucian wrote that Asander "at about ninety years proved himself a match for anyone in fighting from horseback or on foot; but when he saw his subjects going over to Scribonius on the eve of battle, he starved himself to death at the age of ninety-three."

== Subsequent Events ==
Cassius Dio wrote that a certain Scribonius claimed to be a grandson of Mithridates VI and that he had received the Bosporan Kingdom from Augustus after the death of Asander. He gained the control of the kingdom by marrying Dynamis, who had been entrusted with the regency of the kingdom by her husband. Marcus Vipsanius Agrippa sent Polemon I of Pontus against him. Scribonius was killed by the people, before Polemon got there because they had heard of his advance. They resisted Polemon because they were afraid that he may be appointed as their king. Polemon defeated them but was unable to quell the rebellion until Agrippa went to Sinope to prepare a campaign against them. They surrendered. Polemon was appointed as their king. He married Dynamis with the sanction of Augustus.

Dynamis died in 14 BC, and Polemon ruled until his death in 8 BC, succeeded by Aspurgus.

== Bibliography ==
Primary sources

- Cassius Dio, Roman History, vol. 4, Books 41-45 (Loeb Classical Library), Loeb, 1989; ISBN 978-0674990739
- Cassius Dio, Roman History, vol. 5, Books 46-50 (Loeb Classical Library), Loeb, 1989; ISBN 978-0674990913
- Strabo, Geography: vol. 5, Books 10-12 (Loeb Classical Library), Loeb, 1989; ISBN 978-0674992337
- Strabo, Geography: vol. 6, Books 13-14 (Loeb Classical Library), Loeb, 1989; ISBN 978-0674992467

Secondary sources

- Mayor, A., The Poison King: The Life and Legend of Mithradates, Rome's Deadliest Enemy, Princeton University Press, 2009, ISBN 978-0691150260

== See also ==
- Bosporan Kingdom
- Roman Crimea
