= Bithynia and Pontus =

Roman province located in modern-day Turkey

Coordinates: 41.5000°N 33.2600°E

Provincia Bithynia et Pontus Ἐπαρχία Βιθυνίας καὶ Πόντου
- Province of the Roman Empire
- 74 BC/64 BC–c. 300 AD
- The province of Bithynia et Pontus within the Roman Empire, ca. 125 AD
- Capital: Nicomedia (modern-day İzmit, Turkey)
- Historical era: Antiquity
  - Bithynia and Pontus annexed: 74 BC/64 BC
  - Diocletian Reforms: c. 300 AD
Preceded by
Kingdom of Bithynia
Kingdom of Pontus
Succeeded by
Bithynia (late Roman province)
Honorias
Paphlagonia (late Roman province)
- Today part of: Turkey

Bithynia and Pontus (Latin: Provincia Bithynia et Pontus; Ancient Greek: Ἐπαρχία Βιθυνίας καὶ Πόντου, romanized: Eparkhía Bithynías kaì Póntou) was the name of a province of the Roman Empire on the Black Sea coast of Anatolia (modern-day Turkey). It was formed during the late Roman Republic by the amalgamation of the former kingdoms of Bithynia (made a province by Rome 74 BC) and Pontus (annexed to Bithynia 74 BC). The amalgamation was part of a wider conquest of Anatolia and its reduction to Roman provinces.

In 74 BC, Nicomedes IV of Bithynia willed his kingdom to the Romans, whom he hoped would defend it against its old enemy, Pontus. Due to the influence of Julius Caesar, then a young man and a guest-friend of Nicomedes, and an impassioned speech by the deceased king's sister Nysa before the Senate, the gift was accepted. Contemporary Rome was divided into two parties, the Populares, party of the "people," and the Optimates, party of the "best." The guest-friendship had been offered to Caesar, a popular, to save his life by keeping him from Rome during a proscription (a kind of hunt for political enemies) by Sulla, an optimate in power. Forever after Caesar had to endure scurrilous optimate slander about his relationship to Nicomedes, but Bithynia became a favored project of the populares.

The Populares held both consulships at Rome. Marcus Aurelius Cotta, a maternal uncle of Julius Caesar, was sent to secure the province as governor. Mithridates VI of Pontus, seeing a prospective addition to his kingdom about to escape, attacked Bithynia even before the consul arrived. Cotta sent for his co-consul, Lucius Licinius Lucullus. The Third Mithridatic War ensued and dragged on. At the end of their consulships the two commanders stayed on as proconsuls. Mithridates was able to mobilize almost all the rest of Anatolia against them. The two populares were insufficiently skilled to take on Mithridates. Cotta was removed finally by the Senate on a charge of corruption. Lucullus' men mutinied. In the confusion he lost nearly all Anatolia and was out of it. Their patience at an end, the Senate chose the best commander they had. In 66 BC Rome passed the Lex Manilia appointing Pompey, a popular, as Summus Imperator, a term that would find more use after the Civil War. He had the full support of Caesar, then coming into his own. He was to have a totally free hand in Asia. By 64 BC all of Mithridates' allies had been defeated or forced to change sides. Driven from Pontus, hunted through Anatolia, he was assassinated at last by former friends hoping to win Roman favor.

The wealth of Anatolia was now at Rome's command. It was Pompey's task to divide it into provinces. He kept the larger regions and combined the smaller city states. Pontus never became a province of its own. It was simply added to its former competitor, Bithynia, while its name was tacked on at the end of Bithynia. This was not a marriage of different cultures. The coast of the Black Sea had long been Hellenized, despite differences of ancestral populations. The new province began in 74 BC. It was of storied wealth and importance to the Republic. Pompey went on to be in the First Triumvirate with his fellow Populares. It was the peak of his career. They had a falling-out and fought the Roman Civil War. The last popular standing, Octavian Caesar, assumed the title imperator on a permanent basis and was granted another by the Senate, Augustus. Bithynia and Pontus went on from that date, 27 BC, as an imperial province, a name which it kept.

== Geography ==
The Roman province of Bithynia et Pontus (et is Latin "and") comprised a coastal strip of hilly country containing tracts of intensely fertile, arable land, in a mild and moist climate, on the southern shore of the Black Sea from the Bosphorus to approximately the city of Trabzon. Just to the south of the coastal strip was an east-west striking range, the Pontic Mountains, isolating the coast from the Central Anatolia Region, a temperate plateau of grasslands and low forests. The province extended up the slopes to the ridge. On its reverse side were valleys and plateaus in which were situated cities that were on the edge of the coastal province but were not part of it.

== History ==
The Kingdom of Bithynia became a Roman ally around 149 BC. In 74 BC, during the Third Mithridatic War, King Nicomedes IV of Bithynia died and, hoping to secure his kingdom from further Pontic aggression, bequeathed his kingdom to Rome. The Senate immediately voted to annex the kingdom as a province directly governed by the Republic. The province of Pontus, which was conquered and created by the Roman Empire's from the Pontus in 65 BC, was combined with the province of Bithynia, which was created in 74 BC when the last Bithynian king Nicomedes IV, left the Kingdom of Bithynia to the Roman Empire with a will, and was attached to the province of Bithynia and Pontus.

=== Republican civil wars ===
Bithynia and Pontus became an important player during the Roman Republican civil wars. When Julius Caesar crossed the Rubicon River in 49 BC and started his civil war, many of members of the Roman Senate under the leadership of Pompey fled to the East. The Galatian client king Deiotarus, ruler of the rump state of eastern Pontus (Lesser Armenia), sided with his old patron Pompey against Caesar. However, following Pompey's defeat at the Battle of Pharsulus and subsequent death in 48 BC, Deiotarus faced execution by Caesar's forces until the Roman orator Marcus Tullius Cicero pleaded his case and secured his pardon from Caesar. Caesar subsequently named Gnaeus Domitius Calvinus as his chief lieutenant in Asia Minor while Caesar traveled to Ptolemaic Egypt.

With the Caesar in Egypt, Pharnaces II, the Roman client king of the Bosporan Kingdom and the youngest son of Mithridates VI, seized the opportunity and conquered Colchis and Lesser Armenia. The rulers of Cappadocia and Galatia, Ariobarzanes III and Deiotarus respectively, appealed to Calvinus for protection and soon the Roman forces sought battle with Pharnaces II. They met at the Battle of Nicopolis in eastern Anatolia in 48 BC, where Pharnaces II soundly defeated the Roman army and overran much of Cappadocia, Pontus, and Bithynia.

After defeating the Ptolemaic forces at the Battle of the Nile, Caesar left Egypt in 47 BC and travelled through Syria, Cilicia, and Cappadocia to face Pharnaces II. As Pharnaces II gained word of Caesar's approach with his veteran army, he sent envoys to seek a peace, which Caesar refused. Caesar met Pharnaces II at the Battle of Zela, decisively defeating the Pontic king and reasserting Roman dominance over Asia Minor. Upon his return to the Bosporan Kingdom, Pharnaces II was assassinated by his son-in-law Asander. In return, Caesar named Asander as the kingdom's new Roman client king. Caesar then incorporated Lesser Armenia into the Roman client kingdom of Cappadocia to serve as a buffer between Rome's interests in Asia Minor against future aggression from Eastern kingdoms.

In 45 BC, Caesar, now dictator of Rome, appointed Quintus Marcius Crispus as governor of Bithynia and Pontus. Following Caesar's assassination on March 15, 44 BC, by the members of the Roman Senate, Marcus Junius Brutus and Gaius Cassius Longinus fled from Italy and assumed command of the Republic's eastern provinces, including Bithynia and Pontus, in 43 BC. When Crispus refused to serve the assassin of his patron, Cassius had him removed from office and forced into retirement. Following the defeat of Brutus and Cassius by the Second Triumvirate at the Battle of Philippi in 42 BC, Triumvir Mark Antony assumed command of the Republic's eastern provinces.

The Second Triumvirate expired in 33 BC, ending Antony's legal right to govern the Eastern half of the Republic. With the Triumvirate lapsed, the struggle for dominance between Antony and Octavian intensified. As Octavian built up his support in the West, Antony drew ever closer to Egyptian Queen Cleopatra. When Octavian declared war on Egypt, Antony, supported by the Eastern provinces (including Bithynia and Pontus) went to Egypt's aid against Octavian. Octavian's victory over Antony at the Battle of Actium in 31 BC ensured Octavian's position as undisputed master of the Roman world. In 27 BC, Octavian became "Augustus": the first Roman Emperor.

=== Rump State ===
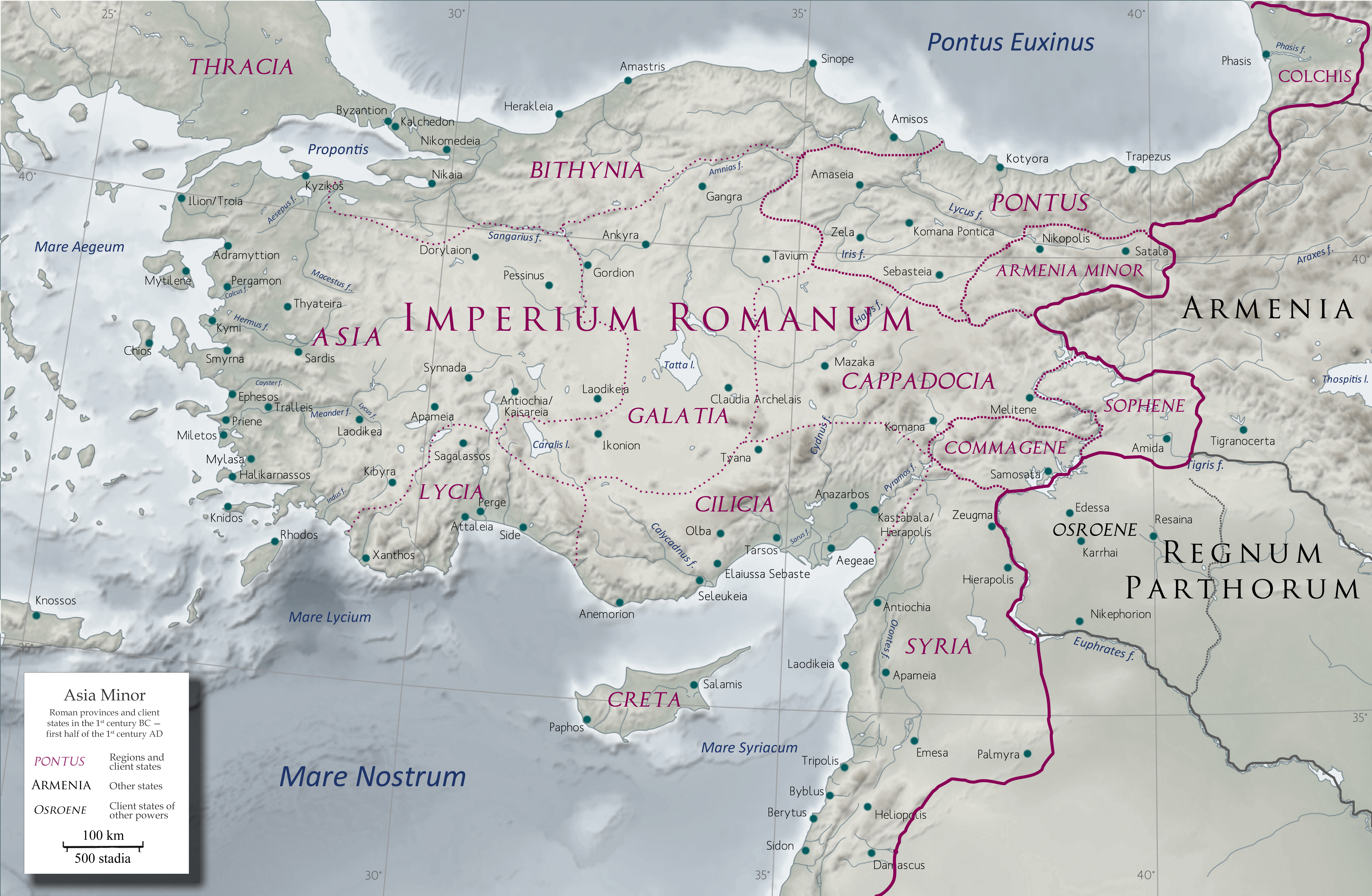
Anatolia in the early 1st century AD with Pontus as a Roman client state

In 39 BC, Antony stripped control of Lesser Armenia (the remnants of the former Kingdom of Pontus) from the rulership of the Cappadocian king Ariarathes X of Cappadocia and made Darius of Pontus, son of Pharnaces II of Pontus, the Roman client king of Pontus. Antony also granted to Darius the rulership of the Roman client kingdom of Cilicia. His reign lasted until his death in 37 BC, after which Antony appointed Polemon I of Pontus as client king of Cilicia and Arsaces of Pontus as client king of Lesser Armenia.

Following Arsaces' untimely death the next year in 36 BC, Antony appointed Polemon I as client king of Pontus. Years later, in 16 BC, Polemon I, at the request of Marcus Vipsanius Agrippa and with the approval of Roman Emperor Augustus, married Queen Dynamis of the Bosporan Kingdom, becoming ruler of that realm in addition to Pontus and Cilicia. Polemone I would later add Colchis to his realm of client kingdoms he ruled on behalf of Rome.

Following Polemon I's death in 8 BC, he was succeeded by his stepson Tiberius Julius Aspurgus as client king of the Bosporan Kingdom and by his second wife Pythodorida of Pontus became client queen of Pontus, Cilicia, and Colchis. Pythodorida would marry then King Archelaus, the Roman client king of Cappadocia, in 8 BC, thereby joining the several eastern client kingdom under a single family. Following Archelaus' death in 14 AD and the subsequent transformation of Cappadocia into a directly governed province in 18 AD, Pythodorida lost her title as queen of Cappadocia.

Pythodorida was succeeded by her stepson Polemon II of Pontus following her death in 38 AD. Polemon II ruled as a Roman client king over Pontus and Cilicia until the Roman Emperor Nero deposed him in 62 AD. Cilicia was then annexed into a directly governed Roman province and Pontus was re-incorporated in Cappadocia, then a directly governed Roman province.

=== Principate ===
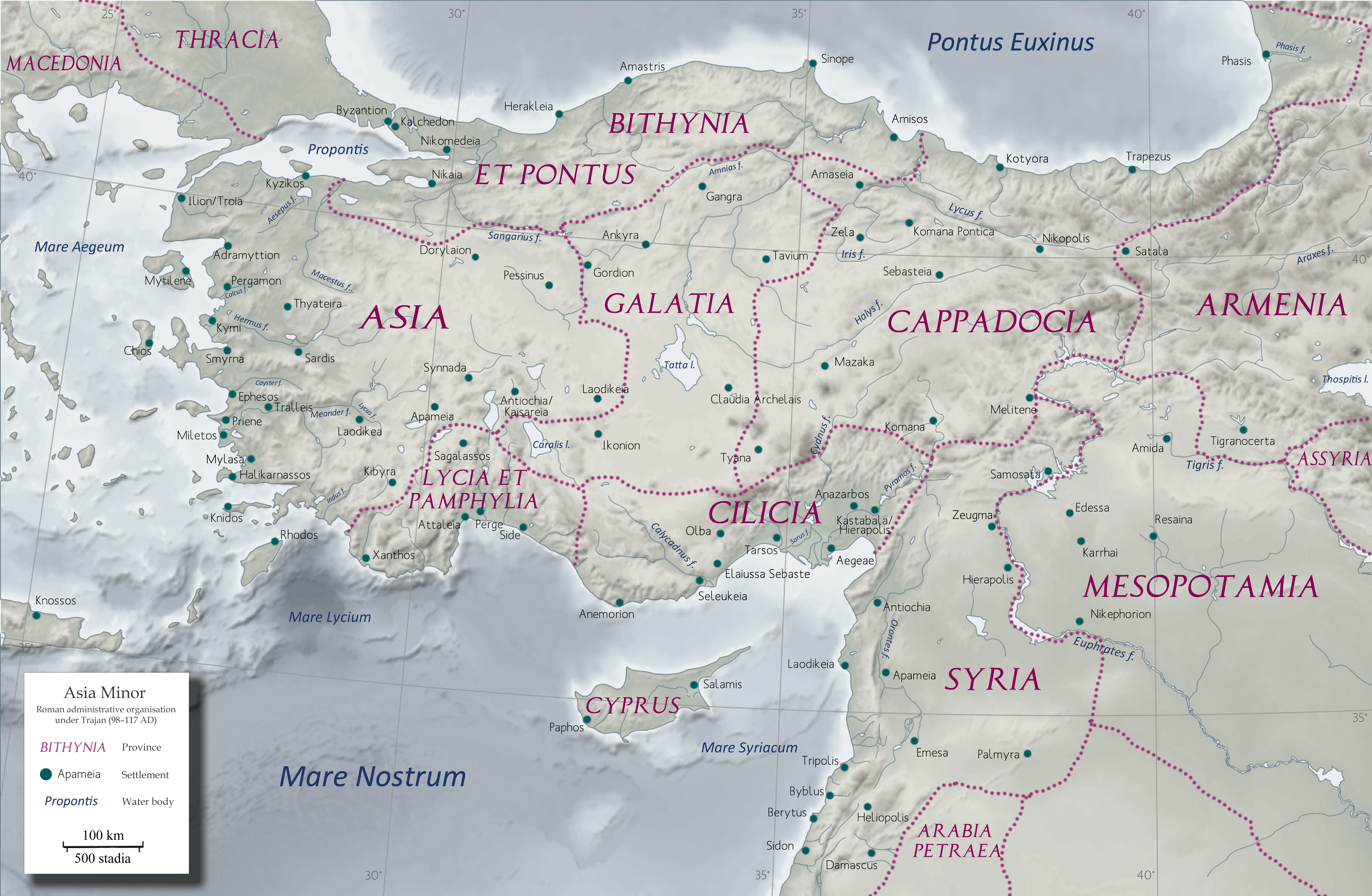
The Roman provinces of Asia Minor under Trajan, including the western Asia Minor Senatorial province of "Bithynia and Pontus".

As part of the Constitutional Reforms of Augustus, which transformed the Roman Republic into the Roman Empire, Rome's territories were divided into imperial provinces and senatorial provinces. Imperial provinces were border lands which required a permanent military presence to protect the Empire from invasion. As such, only the Emperor (as supreme commander of the army) had the right to appoint the governors of those provinces.

Senatorial provinces, conversely, were centered along the Mediterranean Sea and did not possess any significant military force; the province of Bithynia and Pontus, being located along the southern Black Sea coast, was an exception although it too lacked any significant garrison. Augustus allowed the Senate to appoint the governors of these provinces as it had done with all provinces under the Republican system: a sortition was used to select a proconsul who would have imperium over the territory, and be assisted by a legatus or a lieutenant governor, and quaestor who handled financial issues.

The Roman writer Pliny the Younger was governor of the province in AD 110-113. His Epistulae ("Letters") to emperor Trajan (ruled 98-117) are a major source on Roman provincial administration.

The cities of Bithynia took on many features of Roman cities (e.g. councils of decuriones) in the Imperial period, to a much greater degree than the rest of Roman Asia Minor.

According to Cassius Dio, around AD 134 the Senate ceded control of Bithynia and Pontus to the Emperor in return for Lycia et Pamphylia.

=== Dominate ===
Under the administrative reforms of emperor Diocletian, c.295, Bithynia et Pontus was divided into 3 smaller provinces: Bithynia, Honorias and Paphlagonia (replaced by the Theme of Paphlagonia around 820). These belonged to the diocese of Pontica (established c. 314), in turn part of the Prefecture of the East (established c. 337).

== Legacy ==
Following the Muslim invasions of the 640s AD, the Byzantine Empire reorganized its provincial structure into themes. The province of Bithynia and Pontus was reorganized into the Bucellarian, Opsikion, and Optimatoi themes.

== See also ==
- List of Roman governors of Bithynia and Pontus
- Kingdom of Pontus
- Mithridates VI of Pontus

== Bibliography ==
- French, David H (2013). "Fasc. 3.4 Pontus et Bithynia (with northern Galatia)". Roman Roads & Milestones of Asia Minor (PDF). Electronic Monograph 4. Vol. 3 Milestones. Ankara: British Institute. ISBN 9781898249283. Archived from the original (PDF) on 2022-01-07.
- Zając, Barbara (2023). Between Roman culture and local tradition: Roman provincial coinage of Bithynia and Pontus during the reign of Trajan (98-117 AD). Oxford: Archaeopress. ISBN 9781803274652.
