= Farnace =

Opera by Antonio Vivaldi

- Opera by Antonio Vivaldi
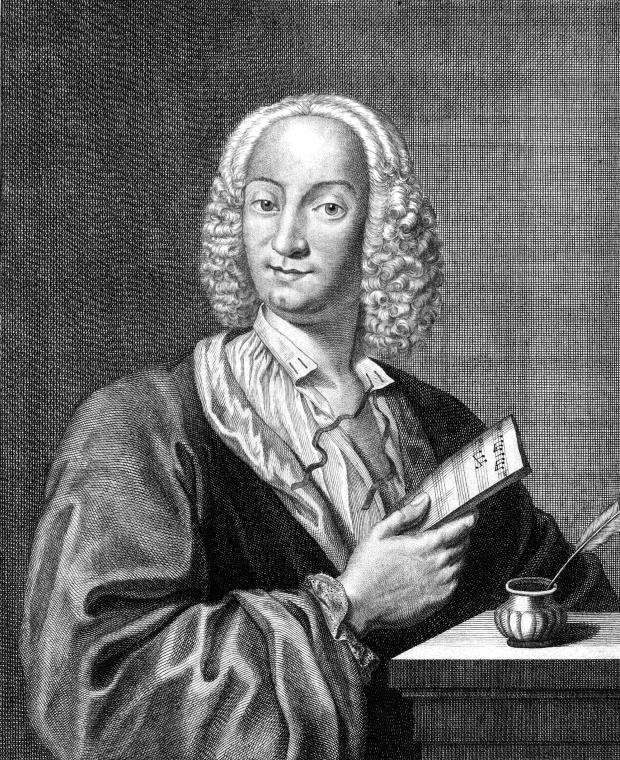
- Putative portrait of Antonio Vivaldi, 1725
- Librettist: Antonio Maria Lucchini
- Language: Italian
- Premiere: 1727; Teatro San Angelo, Venice

Farnace is an opera by Italian composer Antonio Vivaldi, set to a libretto by Antonio Maria Lucchini initially set by Leonardo Vinci during 1724. Vivaldi's setting received its first performance in 1727 at the Teatro Sant'Angelo in Venice. Popular at the time, and revived with great success at the Sporck theater in Prague in 1730, Vivaldi's Farnace (RV 711) slipped into oblivion until the last quarter of the 20th century when it emerged from obscurity.

== History of the libretto ==
Farnace is the title of several 18th-century operas set to various librettos. The earliest version was written by Lorenzo Morari with music by Antonio Caldara, first performed at the Teatro Sant'Angelo in Venice in 1703. The best known libretto on this subject, however, was written by Antonio Maria Lucchini and set by Vinci and Vivaldi.

== Corselli version ==
Farnace was recomposed by Francesco Corselli (1705–1778) (an Italian composer with a French father). Corselli's Farnace received its debut in Madrid at the Royal Theater of the Buen Retiro in 1739. Additional settings continued to be composed as late as the 1780s. One later setting is the one composed by Josef Mysliveček for the Teatro di San Carlo in Naples in 1767. It is mainly the Vivaldi setting that continues to attract interest today.

== Roles ==
Roles, voice types, premiere cast
Role	Voice type (Vivaldi's first setting)	Premiere cast Venice 10 February 1727
Farnace, King of Pontus	contralto (en travesti)	Maria Maddalena Pieri
Tamiri, Farnace's wife	contralto	Anna Maddalena Giraud, also named "la (or Annina) Girò"
Berenice, Tamiri's mother	contralto	Angela Capuano Romana, also named "la Capuanina"
Pompeo, Victorious Roman soldier	tenor	Lorenzo Moretti
Selinda, Farnace's sister	contralto	Lucrezia Baldini
Gilade, Berenice's Captain	soprano castrato	Filippo Finazzi
Aquilio, Roman soldier	contralto castrato	Domenico Giuseppe Galletti

== Synopsis ==
The opera tells the story of Pharnaces II; according to the uses of the time there is no historical accuracy since the fate of Pharnaces is quite different from the one in history books.

Farnace, King of Pontus, has been defeated, and to avoid their falling into the hands of the enemy, he commands his wife, Tamiri, to kill their son and then herself. Tamiri's mother, Berenice, hates Farnace and is in cahoots with Pompey, the Roman victor, to kill him. Selinda, Farnace's sister, is taken captive by the Roman Aquilius, who falls in love with her, as does Berenice's Captain, Gilades. Selinda plays them off one another in an attempt to save her brother. Somehow, it ends happily and everyone is spared.

== Recordings ==
- Farnace – Sara Mingardo, Le Concert des Nations, Coro del Teatro de la Zarzuela Madrid Jordi Savall Alia Vox 2002, combined with a few selections from the Corselli version. reissued Naive with Corselli arias at the beginning of each disc removed.
- Farnace – Max Emanuel Cencic, Ruxandra Donose; I Barocchisti, Diego Fasolis, cond. Rec. 2010. Virgin Classics CD
- Il Farnace – Mary-Ellen Nesi, Delphine Galou, Sonia Prina. Orchestra del Maggio Musicale Fiorentino Dario Shikhmiri: Federico Maria Sardelli Dynamic 2CD
