= Pontic War =

48–47 BCE war

- Part of Caesar's civil war and Roman–Greek wars
- Caesar's campaigns from Rome to Zela
Date	48–47 BC
Location	Asia Minor
Result	Roman victory

Belligerents
Roman Republic; Galatia; Cappadocia	Pontus

Commanders and leaders
Gaius Julius Caesar; Domitius Calvinus	Pharnaces II

Strength
Unknown	Unknown

Casualties and losses
Unknown	Unknown

The Pontic War of 48–47 BC was an armed conflict between Rome and the king of Bosporus and Pontus, Pharnaces II, who tried to restore the kingdom of Mithridates VI.

== Background ==
After the death of Mithridates, Pompey made his son Pharnaces king of the Bosporus. Pharnaces was declared a friend of the Roman people and became a client of Pompey, but in civil war he did not provide any help to him, taking a wait-and-see attitude. He hoped to take advantage of the internal struggle among the Romans and regain his father's kingdom.

The Pompeians still considered him as a potential ally, and after the defeat at Pharsalus Gaius Cassius with 70 triremes went to the Bosporus for help, but was overtaken by Caesar in the Hellesponte and forced to surrender.

== War ==
Apparently, soon after receiving the news of Pompey's defeat, Pharnaces began active actions. The first target was Phanagoria, which the Romans granted independence. The city was besieged. Experiencing hunger, the inhabitants were forced to fight, in which they were defeated. Pharnaces treated the vanquished quite gently, declared them his friends, and took hostages to ensure loyalty. Perhaps this operation was carried out as early as July 48 BC. e.

Then Pharnaces moved to the southeast along the Black Sea coast, "without difficulty he subjugated Colchis and all of Armenia in the absence of Deiotarus and conquered some of the cities of Cappadocia and Pontus, assigned to the Bithynia region." Deiotarus was a client of Pompey and participated in the Battle of Pharsalus, after which he fled with Pompey on a ship. If he accompanied his patron all the way to Egypt, he could hardly return to Asia Minor until the beginning of October. By this time, Pharnaces had already reached the Roman borders.

While Pharnaces acted against Pompey's allies and clients, he could still formally look like a supporter of Caesar, and in his time T. Mommsen concluded from this that Pharnaces acted in the interests of Caesar. But in order to reconquer the kingdom of Mithridates, it was necessary to return the areas that had gone to the Roman province Bithynia and Pontus, and this made a clash with the Romans inevitable.

By October 48 BC. e. Pharnaces captured Sinope and took possession of Paphlagonia and Pontus. King Deiotarus asked Caesar's legate Domitius Calvinus, who was left to govern the provinces of Asia Minor, to prevent Pharnaces from capturing and plundering his kingdom, Armenia Minor and Cappadocia, which belonged to Ariobarzanes III, for otherwise the kings would not be able to collect the indemnity that Caesar.

Domitius Calvin demanded that Pharnaces cleanse Armenia and Cappadocia, “and not use the civil war to encroach on the rights and majesty of the Roman people.” To reinforce his demands, he began to gather troops. Of the three available legions, two had to be sent to Caesar in Egypt. To the remaining XXXVI legion, the governor added two legions created by Deiotarus on the Roman model, one hundred horsemen each from Deiotarus and Ariobarzanes, a legion of recruits from Pontus and auxiliary troops from Cilicia. These forces gathered in Comana Pontica.

Pharnaces withdrew his troops from Cappadocia, but, having learned that Domitius had only one legion left, he refused to leave Minor Armenia, declaring that he had the right to this country as his father's possession, and proposing to transfer the issue of it to Caesar. The governor was not satisfied with this answer; he believed that Pharnaces had retreated to Armenia in order to shorten the front line and make it easier for himself to defend, and therefore demanded that this area also be cleared. The Roman army set out on a campaign in Lesser Armenia.

== Aftermath ==
After this victory, Pharnaces captured all of Pontus, taking many cities in battle, in which he committed robberies and cruel reprisals.

...he subjected those who were attractive for their beauty and youth to punishments that were worse than death itself. In general, no one defended himself against him, and he occupied Pontus, boasting that he had regained his father's kingdom.

He sold the inhabitants of the city Amisa, who sided with the Romans, into slavery, and castrated their sons. According to Plutarcha, Pharnaces occupied Bithynia and Cappadocia, and began to induce kings and tetrarchss. Apparently, he was preparing to invade the province of Asia, when he received news that Asander, who had been left governor in the Bosporus, had rebelled. Postponing the attack on the Romans, Pharnaces set out on a campaign against the Bosporus. According to Appian, Asander drove Pharnaces out of Asia because the Romans had no time.

Meanwhile, Caesar ended the Egyptian campaign, landed in Antioch, and marched north, solving administrative problems along the way. On the border with Pontus, he gathered troops that turned out to be weak both in numbers and in fighting qualities. From Alexandria he brought the VI Legion, consisting of veterans, but after battles and campaigns there were less than a thousand people in its composition. He received one legion from Deiotarus, and two more - those who took part in the battle of Nicopolis.

Pharnaces had to cancel his campaign against the Bosporus and move against Caesar. He tried to avoid a confrontation and entered into negotiations, pointing out that he had not assisted Pompey (and therefore was a friend of Caesar), unlike Deiotarus and Ariobarzanes, who fought against Caesar and were still forgiven. Caesar advised not to refer to Deiotarus, and sarcastically added that by refusing to help Pompey, Pharnaces did not serve him, Caesar, but only himself, since he avoided defeat. Then Caesar philosophically remarked that he still “cannot restore life to the murdered and the ability to bear children to the castrated”, and therefore is ready to forgive Pharnaces these crimes against Roman citizens if he cleanses Pontus and returns the loot.

Appian writes that the Pontic ambassadors, “out of their stupidity,” even suggested that Caesar become engaged to the daughter of Pharnaces. Pharnaces sent embassies three times; he delayed negotiations, because he knew that Caesar was being called to Italy by urgent matters, and therefore hoped that he would leave Asia Minor without any conditions. These circumstances prompted Caesar to seek a decisive battle.

== Battle of Zela and Death of Pharnaces ==
The general battle took place on August 2, 47 BC. e. near the Pontic city Zela, where in 67 BC. e. Mithridates defeated the army of legate Lucullusa Triarius. Pharnaces' army was completely defeated, and he himself fled to Sinope with a thousand horsemen. Caesar sent Domitius Calvin after him. Pharnaces handed over Sinope to him, made peace and was released with his people. Having loaded the horsemen onto the ships (the horses had to be killed), he sailed to the Bosporus, there, “'gathering some Scythians and Sauromatians'”, captured Feodosia and Pantikapaion. His successes were short-lived. Asander counterattacked, and since Pharnaces could not find new horses for his riders, and they did not know how to fight on foot, he was soon defeated and died in battle. This could have happened as early as August–September 47 BC. e.

Having recaptured Pontus, Caesar sent the VI Legion to Italy, returned his troops to Deiotarus, and left two legions in Pontus under the command of Caelius Vinicianus.

== Sources ==
- Appian, The Civil Wars, Penguin Classics, new edition, 1996; ISBN 978-0140445091
- Appian, The Foreign Wars, The Mithridatic Wars, CreateSpace Independent Publishing Platform, 2014; ISBN 978-1503114289
- Cassius Dio, Roman History, vol. 4, Books 41-45 (Loeb Classical Library), Loeb, 1989; ISBN 978-0674990739
- Hazel, John (2002). Who's who in the Roman World. Routledge. ISBN 978-0-415-29162-0.
- Marek, Christian (2003). Pontus et Bithynia: die römischen Provinzen im Norden Kleinasiens (in German). Von Zabern. ISBN 978-3-8053-2925-5.
