= Roman–Greek wars =

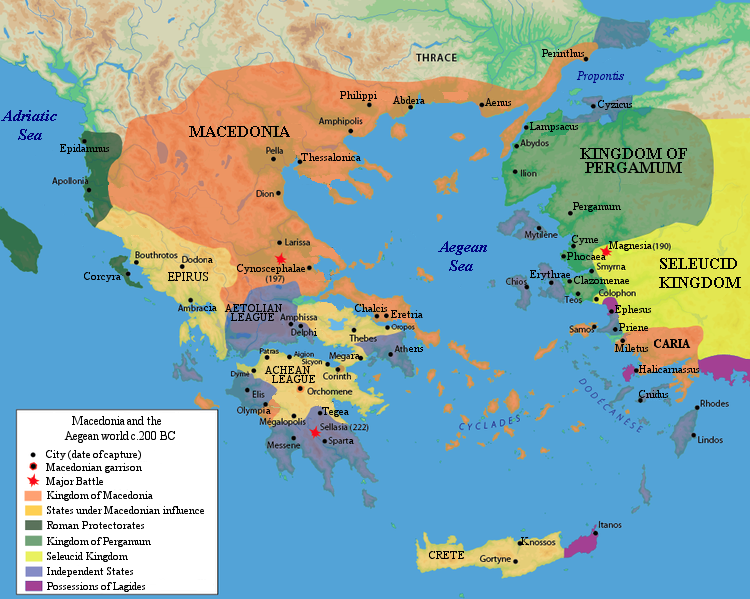
Macedonia and the Aegean world circa 200 BC

The Roman–Greek wars were a series of armed conflicts between the Roman Republic and several Greek states of the Hellenistic period.

The list includes:

- The Pyrrhic War (280–275 BC), which ended with the victory of the Romans and the conquest of Greek cities in South Italy despite earlier albeit costly victories by king Pyrrhus of Epirus, since regarded as 'Pyrrhic victories' (making the origin of this term).
- The First Macedonian War (214–205 BC), which ended in a stalemate with the Peace of Phoenice.
- The Second Macedonian War (200–197 BC), during which the Romans defeated the Kingdom of Macedon.
- The War against Nabis (195 BC), also known as the Laconian War, against Sparta.
- The Roman–Seleucid war (192–188 BC), which ended with the defeat of the Seleucid Empire and the Treaty of Apamea, and the subjugation of the Aetolian League.
- The Third Macedonian War (171–168 BC), after which the kingdom of Macedon ceased to exist and its territory was divided into four Roman client republics.
- The Fourth Macedonian War (150–148 BC), after which Macedonia was formally annexed as a Roman province.
- The Achaean War (146 BC), in which Rome defeated the Achaean League at the Battle of Corinth, completely destroyed the city, and annexed mainland Greece.
- The First Mithridatic War (89–85 BC), during which Rome fought with the Kingdom of Pontus over control of Anatolia.
- The Second Mithridatic War (83–81 BC), which ended with a Pontic victory.
- The Third Mithridatic War (73–63 BC), in which Rome conquered both the Kingdom of Pontus and Syria.
- The Pontic War (48–47 BC), in which Rome defeated Pharnaces II, who had plans to restore the Kingdom of Pontus.
- The War of Actium (32–30 BC), in which Rome delivered the final blow by conquering Ptolemaic Egypt and ending the Hellenistic period.

== See also ==
- Macedonian Wars
- Mithridatic Wars
- Punic Wars
- Roman–Gallic wars
- Roman–Persian Wars
