= Legio XXII Deiotariana =

Roman legion

Map of the Roman Empire in AD 125, under emperor Hadrian, showing the Legio XXII Deiotariana, stationed at Alexandria (Alexandria, Egypt), in Aegyptus province, from 8 BC to ca. 123 AD

Legio XXII Deiotariana ("Deiotarus' Twenty-Second Legion") was a legion of the Imperial Roman army, founded ca. 48 BC and disbanded or destroyed during the Bar Kokhba revolt of 132–136. Its cognomen comes from Deiotarus, a Celtic king of Galatia. Its emblem is unknown.

== Legion history ==
=== Origin of the legion ===
The legion was levied by Deiotarus, king of the Celtic tribe of the Tolistobogii, who lived in Galatia, modern Turkey. Deiotarus became an ally of the Roman Republic's general Pompey in 63 BC, who named him king of all the Celtic tribes of Asia Minor, which were collectively known as Galatians (hence the name Galatia for the region). Deiotarus levied an army and trained it with Roman help; the army, in 48 BC, was composed of 12,000 infantrymen and 2,000 horsemen. Cicero writes that the army was divided into thirty cohortes, which were roughly equivalent to three Roman legions of the time. This army supported the Romans in their wars against king Mithridates VI of Pontus, and contributed to Roman victory in the Third Mithridatic War.

After a heavy defeat against king Pharnaces II of Pontus near Nicopolis, the surviving soldiers of Deiotarus’s army formed a single legion, which marched besides Julius Caesar during his victorious campaign against Pontus, and fought with him in the Battle of Zela (47 BC).

=== Early history (BC) ===
On the death of Amyntas in 25 BC, Deiotarus' successor, the Galatian kingdom was absorbed into the Roman Empire. A papyrus recovered from Egypt, dated 8 BC, mentions two soldiers of the legion. Between these two dates, the Galatian army was incorporated as a legion into the Roman army. M.H.D. Parker argues that the date of its incorporation could be narrowed further as between 16 BC and 8 BC; since Caesar Augustus had already 21 legions, the legion received the number XXII.

The Twenty-second was assigned to Nicopolis (next Alexandria, in Aegyptus) together with III Cyrenaica. These two legions had the role of garrisoning the Egyptian province from threats both within and without, given the multi-ethnic nature of Alexandria.

In 26 BC, Aelius Gallus, praefectus Aegypti (praefectus of Egypt), led a campaign against the Nubian kingdoms and another to find Arabia Felix (Yemen). The campaign came quickly to a halt (25 BC) because of the heavy losses in the troops (Romans, Hebrews and Nabateans), due to hunger and epidemics.

The losses were not recovered, so in 23 BC the Nubians, led by queen Kandake Amanirenas, took the initiative and attacked the Romans moving towards Elephantine. The new praefectus of Egypt, Gaius Petronius, obtained reinforcements, and after blocking the Nubians, marched up the Nile to the Nubian capital of Napata, which was sacked in 22 BC. It is highly probable that XXII fought in these wars.

After these actions, the Nubian front remained calm for a long time, so the legions could be employed otherwise. The legionaries were used not only as soldiers, but also as workers, as some of them were sent to the granite mines of Mons Claudianus. Other legionaries were sent in the deepest south of the Egyptian province and scratched their names on the stones of the Colossi of Memnon.

=== Later history ===
Under Nero, the Romans fought a campaign (55–63) against the Parthian Empire, which had invaded the kingdom of Armenia, allied to the Romans. After gaining Armenia in 60 and losing it in 62, the Romans sent XV Apollinaris from Pannonia to Cn. Domitius Corbulo, legatus of Syria. Corbulo, with the legions XV Apollinaris, III Gallica, V Macedonica, X Fretensis and XXII, forced Vologases I of Parthia to a compromise peace in 63, whereby his brother Tiridates would become king of Armenia as a Roman client.

In 66, Zealot Jews killed the Roman garrison in Jerusalem. After the ignominious defeat of the legatus of Syria in 66, T. Flavius Vespasianus entered in Iudaea in 67 with the legions V Macedonica, X Fretensis, XV Apollinaris, one vexillatio of 1,000 legionaries of the XXII, and 15,000 soldiers from the Eastern allies, and started the siege of Jerusalem in 69, which would be completed by his son T. Flavius Vespasianus (better known as Titus) in 70. In fact in 69, the "year of the four emperors", Flavius Vespasianus senior returned to Italy to conquer the imperial throne after Nero's death and Galba's rebellion. The Twenty-second sided with Flavius Vespasianus, who eventually became emperor.

Under Trajan, the legion was officially known as Deiotariana, even if this was its unofficial name since Claudian times.

The last certain record of XXII Deiotariana is from the year 119. In 145, when a list of all existing legions was made, XXII Deiotariana was not included. Whether the legion was disbanded on administrative grounds or was destroyed during conflict remains uncertain.

It is generally proposed that XXII Deiotariana suffered serious losses during the Jewish rebellion of Simon bar Kokhba. According to Peter Schafer's 2003 book "The disappearance of the Legio XXII Deiotariana in connection with the Bar Kokhba Revolt is uncertain and not generally accepted as fact." Evidence from Caesarea Maritima gained support from a number of scholars interpreting the aqueduct reparation inscription made c.133-134 as mentioning Legio XXII Deiotariana. If indeed connected with the legion, the inscription sets the last known location to Judean province during the Bar Kokhba revolt and making the war the most plausible explanation to the legion's disappearance. According to Isaac and Roll, the fact the inscription was apparently deliberately erased was an intentional damnatio memoriae because of Legio XXII's defeat. However, according to Negev, the inscription may be attributed to either Legio Ferrata or Legio Deiotariana.

== Attested members ==
Name	Rank	Province	Dating	Source
Rufus	Legatus legionis	Aegyptus	47-25 BC	CIL 14, 02962
Julius Mithridaticus	Tribunus angusticlavius	Aegyptus	?	CIL 03, 00060
Lucius Baebius Iuncinus	Tribunus angusticlavius	Aegyptus	AD 69-79	CIL 10, 06976
Lucius Decrius Longinus	Primus pilus and Praefectus castrorum	Aegyptus	AD 101-140	AE 1913, 00215
Tiberius Claudius Telesinus	Centurion	Aegyptus	AD 51-100	CIL 06, 03583
Gaius Ramnius Cypronianus	Centurion	Aegyptus	30 BC - AD 200	AE 1989, 00758
Caesellius Fuscus	Centurion	Aegyptus	?	CIL 03, 06598
Valerius Fadianus	Centurion	Aegyptus	?	CIL 03, 06602
Marcus Pontius Saburianus	Pedes	Aegyptus	?	CIL 03, 06598
Titus Gavidius Primus	Pedes	Aegyptus	?	CIL 03, 06602

All members are found in inscriptions from CIL and AE.

== See also ==
- List of Roman legions
- History of the Romans in Arabia
