= Georgia in the Roman era =

The area of Georgia was under Roman control between the 1st century BC and the 7th century AD. This control varied by time and was intermittent over the kingdoms of Colchis and Iberia in the Caucasus region. These kingdoms roughly correspond to some of the western and eastern parts of modern Georgia.

== History ==
Pre-Roman Georgia: Colchis became part of the Roman province of Pontus.

Rome's conquests reached the Caucasus area at the end of the 2nd century BC, when the Roman Republic started to expand in Anatolia and the Black Sea.

In the area of what is now western Georgia there was the Kingdom of Colchis that in those years had fallen under control of the Kingdom of Pontus (an enemy of Rome), while further east there was the "Kingdom of Iberia". As a result of the Roman campaigns of Pompey and Lucullus in 65 BC, the Kingdom of Pontus was completely destroyed by the Romans and all its territory, including Colchis, was incorporated into the Roman Empire as its province. Iberia, on the other hand was invaded and became a vassal state of the empire.

From this point on Colchis became the Roman province of Lazicum, with Emperor Nero later incorporating it into the Province of Pontus in 63 AD, and successively in Cappadocia by Domitian in 81 AD. At the same time, Iberia continued to be a vassal state because it enjoyed significant independence and with the lowlands frequently raided by fierce mountain tribes, paying a nominal homage to Rome in exchange for protection was viewed as a worthwhile investment.

The following 600 years of South Caucasian history were marked by the struggle between Rome and Parthians and Sassanids of Persia who fought long wars against the Romans, known as the Roman-Persian Wars.

Despite the fact that all major fortresses along the seacoast were occupied by the Romans, their rule was pretty loose. In 69 AD, the people of Pontus and Colchis under Anicetus staged a major uprising against the Romans which ended unsuccessfully.

Christianity began to spread in the early 1st century. Traditional accounts relate the event with Saint Andrew, Saint Simon the Zealot, and Saint Matata (but the Hellenistic, local pagan and Mithraic religious beliefs would remain widespread until the 4th century).

While the Laz people's kingdom of Colchis was administered as a Roman province, Caucasian Iberia freely accepted the Roman Imperial protection. A stone inscription discovered at Mtskheta speaks of the 1st-century ruler Mihdrat I (AD 58-106) as "the friend of the Caesars" and the king "of the Roman-loving Iberians." Emperor Vespasian fortified the ancient Mtskheta site of Arzami for the Iberian kings in 75 AD.

In the 2nd century AD, Iberia strengthened her position in the area, especially during the reign of King Pharsman II Kveli (The Prominent) who achieved full independence from Rome and reconquered some of the previously lost territories from declining Armenia. During his reign Iberia and Rome became allies. Pharsman II was even invited by emperor Marcus Aurelius to Rome and an equestrian statue of Iberian king has been erected on Mars square in his honor.

In the 3rd century AD, the Lazi tribe came to dominate most of Colchis, establishing the kingdom of Lazica, locally known as Egrisi. Colchis was a scene of the protracted rivalry between the Eastern Roman/Byzantine and Sassanid empires, culminating in the Lazic War from 542 to 562.

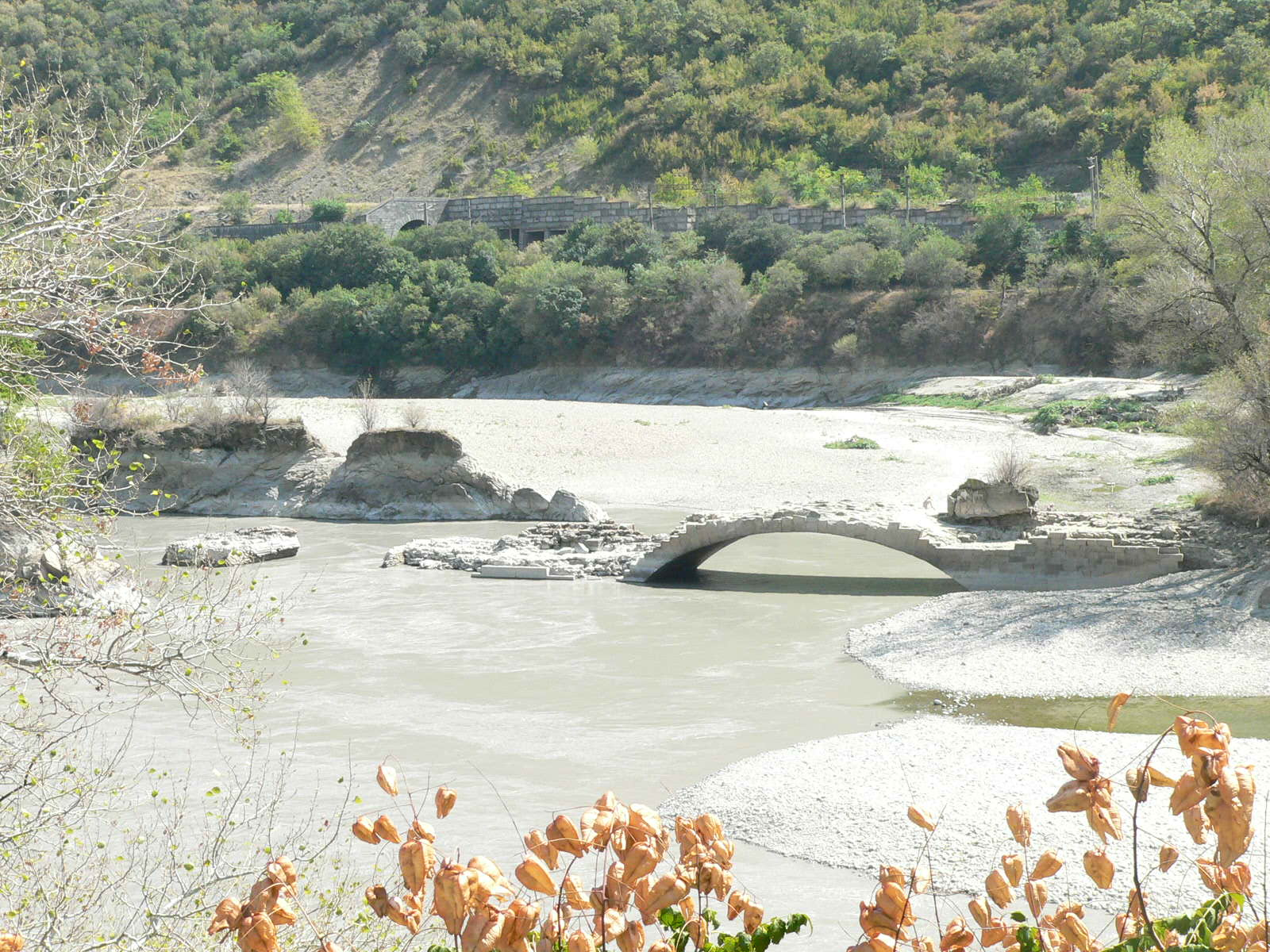
"Pompey's Bridge" was built in Georgia by the Roman legionaries of Pompey

Furthermore, in the early 3rd century, Rome had to acknowledge sovereignty of Caucasian Albania and Armenia to Sassanid Persia, but all what is now Georgia was back under Roman control with Aurelian and Diocletian around 300 AD.

The province of Lazicum (or Lazica) was given a degree of autonomy that by the mid-3rd century developed into full independence with the formation of a new Kingdom of Lazica-Egrisi on the territories of smaller principalities of the Zans, Svans, Apsyls, and Sanyghs. This new South Western Caucasian state survived more than 250 years until 562 when it was absorbed by the Eastern Roman Empire, during Justinian I.

Indeed, in 591 AD Byzantium and Persia agreed to divide Caucasian Iberia between them, with Tbilisi to be in Persian hands and Mtskheta to be under Roman/Byzantine control.

At the beginning of the 7th century the temporary truce between the Romans and Persia collapsed again. The Iberian Prince Stephanoz I (ca. 590-627), decided in 607 AD to join forces with Persia in order to reunite all the territories of Caucasian Iberia, a goal he seems to have accomplished.

But Emperor Heraclius's offensive in 628 AD brought victory over the Persians and ensured Roman predominance in western and eastern Georgia until the invasion and conquest of the Caucasus by the Arabs in the second half of the 7th century.

Indeed, the presence of Rome started to disappear from Georgia after the Battle of Sebastopolis, fought near the eastern shores of the Black Sea in 692 AD between the Umayyads and the Eastern Roman Empire troops led by Leontios.

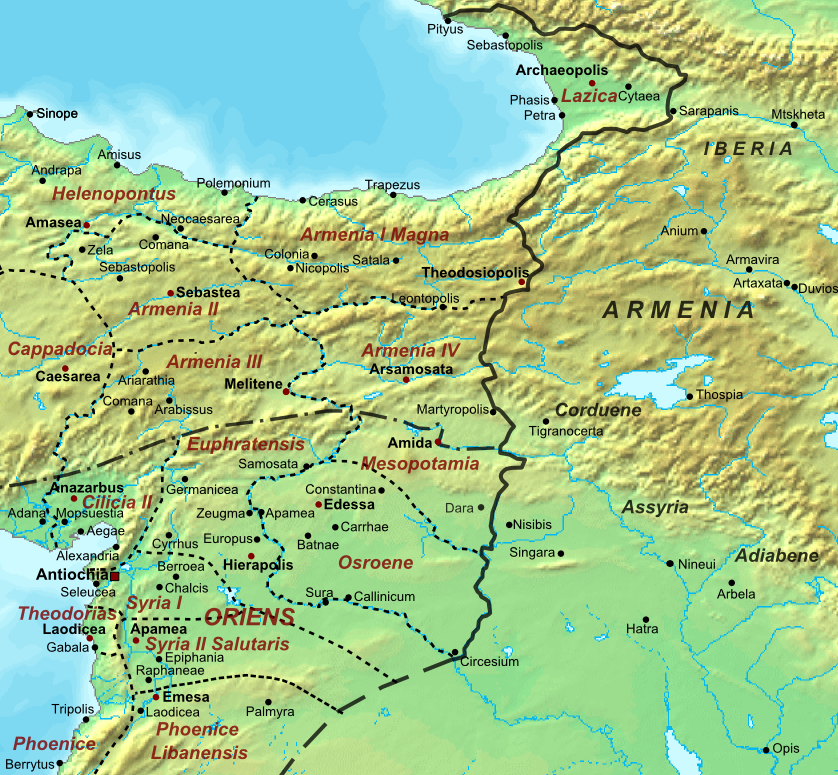
The Lazica province of Justinian in 565 AD

Sebastopolis (actual Sukhumi) continued to remain the last Roman/Byzantine stronghold in western Georgia, until being finally sacked and destroyed by the Arab conqueror Marwan II in 736 AD.

== Roman Christianity ==
One of the main legacies of Rome to Georgia is the Christian faith.

Indeed, Christianity, first preached by the Apostles Simon and Andrew in the 1st century, became the state religion of Caucasian Iberia in 327, making Georgia one of the earliest Christian countries in the world.

The final conversion of all Georgia to Christianity in 327 is credited to St. Nina of Cappadocia. She was the only daughter of pious and noble parents, the Roman general Zabulon, a relative of the great martyr St. George, and Susanna, sister of the Patriarch of Jerusalem.

Christianity was declared the state religion by King Mirian III of Iberia as early as 327 AD, which gave a great stimulus to the development of literature, arts and the unification of the country. In 334 AD, Mirian III commissioned the building of the first Christian church in Iberia which was finally completed in 379 AD on the spot where now stands the Cathedral of the Living Pillar in Mtskheta, the ancient capital of Georgia.

Petra in Lazica is an ancient bishopric in Georgia that is included in the Catholic Church's list of titular sees.

== Roman forts ==
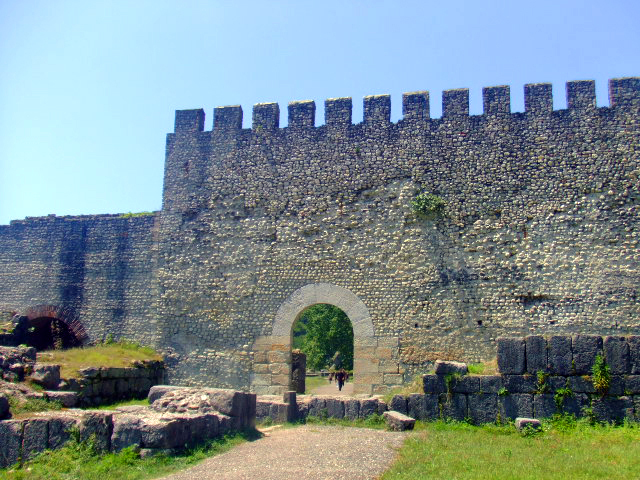
The remnants of the eastern gate in Archaeopolis

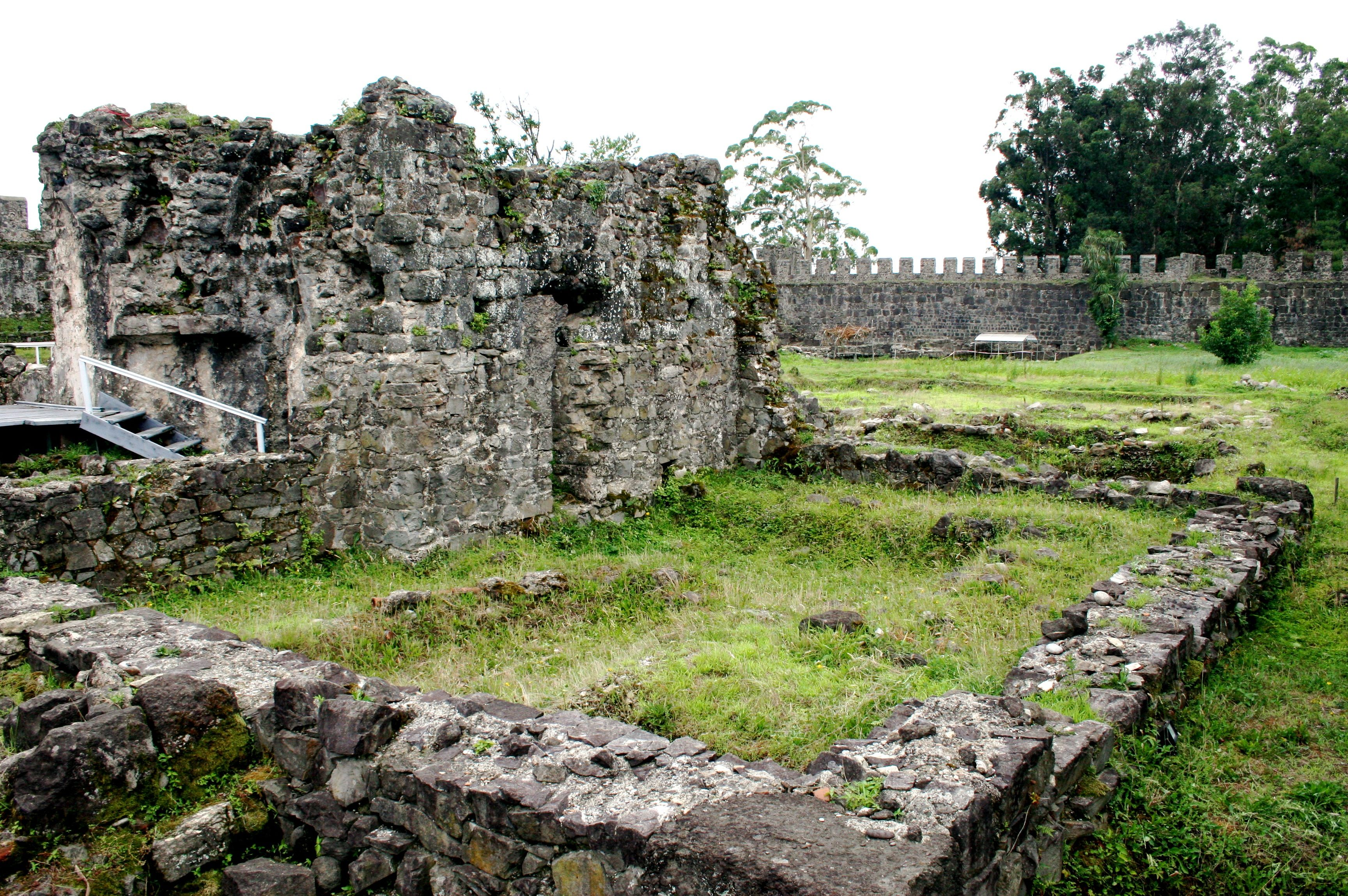
Gonio (previously called "Apsaros"): remains of a Roman bath house in the fortress.

Roman presence was huge in coastal Georgia, where some Roman forts were defended for centuries by legionaries (and had even some Roman colonists living in the related cities). The fortress of Gonio, in the ancient Colchis city of "Apsaros", is considered by some scholars (like Theodore Mommsen) to have been the center of Roman power in western Georgia since the 2nd century AD.

Indeed, Roman culture -according to archeological findings- was widespread in western Lazicum, diminished in eastern Colchis but was minimal in Caucasian Iberia (with the exception of the capital Mtskheta).

The main Roman Forts (and related cities) were:

- Batumi. Under Hadrian it was converted into a fortified Roman port, later deserted for the nearby fortress of Petra founded in the times of Justinian I (around 535 AD).
- Gagra. Romans renamed the town as "Nitica". Its position led the Romans to fortify the town, which was repeatedly attacked by Goths and other invaders in the 5th century.
- Gonio. In the 2nd century AD it was a well-fortified Roman city, with nearly 2000 legionaries. The town was also known for its theatre and hippodrome. There was even a Genoese trade factory at the site in the 13th century.
- Pitsunda. Around the Fort flourished a commercial town. In the late 13th century, the area housed a short-lived Genoese trade colony called "Pezonda".
- Phasis. During the Third Mithridatic War, Phasis (actual Poti) came under the Roman control. It was where Pompey met Servilius, the admiral of his Euxine fleet in 65 BC.
- Sukhumi. Roman emperor Augustus named the city "Sebastopolis". The remains of towers and Roman walls of Sebastopolis have been found underwater. It was the last Roman stronghold in Georgia until 736 AD, when was destroyed by the Arabs.

Archaeopolis (actual Nokalakevi) was ruled by the Romans from Augustus times, but only the Eastern Roman Empire developed in a huge way this fortification in central Lazicum after the 4th century AD. Actually it is a renowned archeological site of Georgia.

Armazi, in eastern Georgia, was another fortified city related to Rome. This fortress near Mtskheta was captured by the Roman general Pompey during his 65 BC campaign against the Iberian king Artag. A ruined structure over the nearby Mtkvari River dates from that time and is still called "Pompey's bridge". Armazi's heyday came when Iberia was allied with the Roman emperors. A stone stele unearthed at Armazi in 1867 reports that the Roman Emperor Vespasian fortified Armazi for the Iberian king Mithridates I in 75 AD. This defense wall constructed in a unique position, to block the southern exit of the Daryal Pass before it widens into the plain of modern Tbilisi, was presumably a preventive measure against the Alans who frequently raided the Roman frontiers from across the Caucasus.

== See also ==
- Roman Empire
- Colchis
- Caucasian Iberia
- Sasanian Iberia
- History of Georgia
- Christianity in Georgia
- Lazic War

== Bibliography ==
- Braund, David. Georgia in Antiquity: A History of Colchis and Transcaucasian Iberia, 550 BC-AD 562. Oxford University Press. New York, 1994 ISBN 0-19-814473-3
- Haldon, John F. Byzantium in the seventh century. Cambridge University Press. Cambridge, 1997
- Lang, David Marshall. The Georgians. Thames & Hudson. London, 1966
- Mommsen, Theodore. The Provinces of the Roman Empire. Barnes & Noble Books. New York, 1996. ISBN 0-7607-0145-8
- Rosen, Roger. Georgia: A Sovereign Country of the Caucasus. Odyssey Publications. Hong Kong, 1999. ISBN 962-217-748-4
- Sherk, Robert. The Roman Empire: Augustus to Hadrian. Cambridge University Press. Cambridge, 1988. ISBN 0-521-33887-5.
- Toumanoff, Cyril. Studies in Christian Caucasian History. Georgetown University Press. Washington, 1963
