= Farnace (Mysliveček) =

Opera by Josef Mysliveček

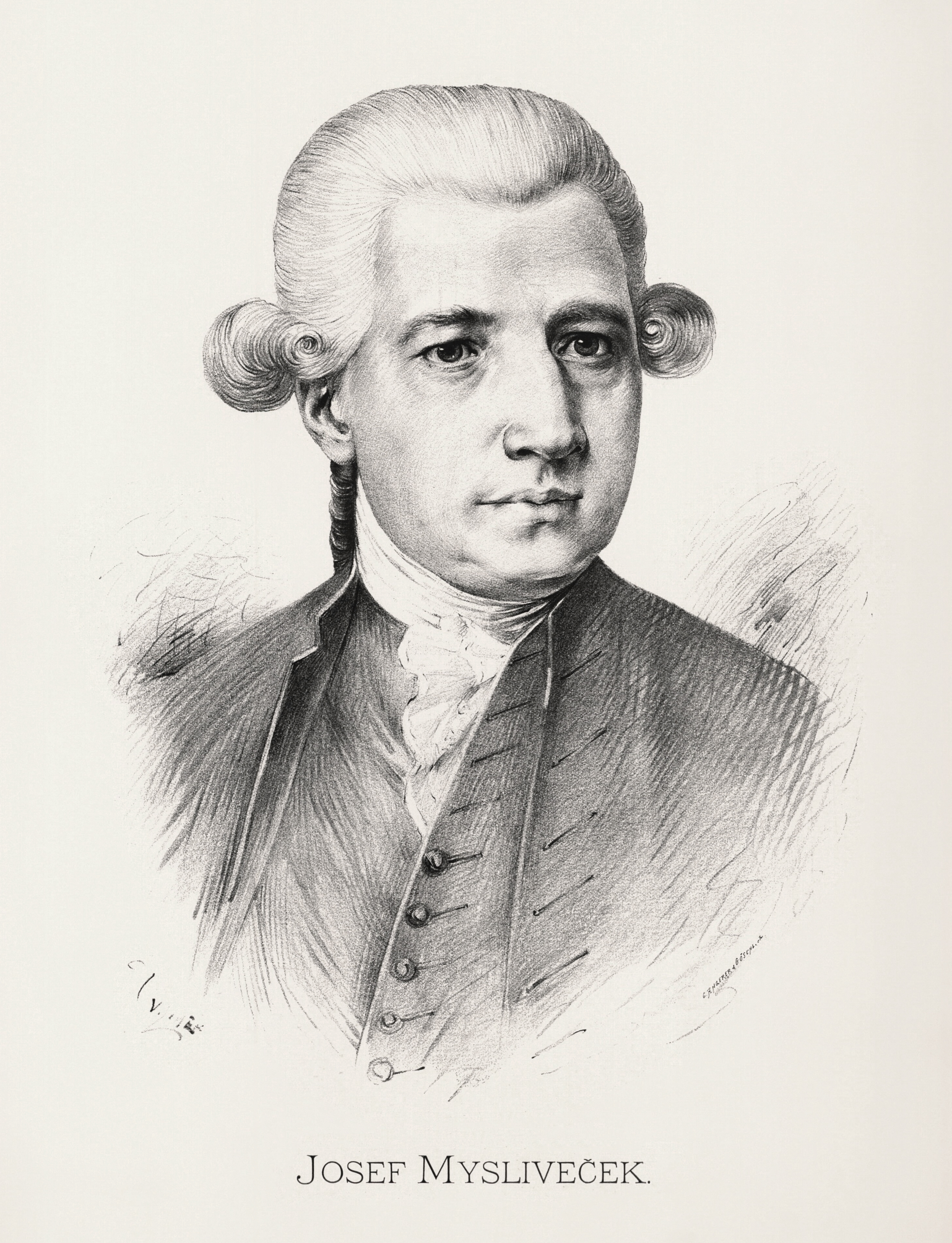
Josef Mysliveček

Farnace is an 18th-century Italian opera in 3 acts by the Czech composer Josef Mysliveček. It belongs to the serious type in Italian referred to as opera seria that would usually feature the designation dramma per musica in librettos. Farnace was composed to a text by the Italian poet Antonio Maria Lucchini that is best known from a setting by Antonio Vivaldi first produced at the Teatro Sant'Angelo in Venice for the carnival operatic season of 1727. For a performance in the 1760s, it would only be expected that a libretto of such age would be abbreviated and altered to suit contemporary operatic taste; this libretto was unusually old, even older than all but one of the librettos by Metastasio that continued by be set in the 1760s. The cuts and changes in the text made for the 1767 performance of Mysliveček's opera are not attributable. Indeed, they are quite extensive; not a single one of Lucchini's original aria texts was re-set by Mysliveček. However, it is the same condensed libretto of Farnace, with small variants, used by the Neapolitan Davide Perez in his version of the opera prepared for the Teatro Regio of Turin in carnival 1751, which was repeated in Rome at the Teatro Argentina the following year, and in Messina (at the Teatro Munizione) and Naples (at the Teatro di San Carlo) in 1753 and again in 1757.

== Performance history ==
The opera was first performed at the Teatro San Carlo in Naples on 4 November 1767, the nameday of King Charles III of Spain, the former ruler of the Kingdom of Naples whose birthday and nameday were still celebrated with operatic productions under the rule of his son Ferdinand. It was commissioned in the wake of the success of the composer's opera Il Bellerofonte, which had been given earlier the same year, and is known to have been successful, in spite of a less distinguished cast. It was repeated in Prague in December 1768 after the composer's triumphant return to his native city.

== Roles ==
Role	Voice type	Premiere cast, 4 November 1767, Teatro San Carlo, Naples
Farnace, King of Pontus	soprano castrato	Carlo Reina
Tamiri, Queen of Pontus, wife of Farnace	soprano	Antonia Maria Girelli Aguilar
Selinda, Sister of Farnace	soprano	Clemenza Bardetti
Atridate, Prefect of the Roman legions	tenor	Ercole Ciprandi
Pompeo, Roman pro-consul in Asia	soprano castrato	Giuseppe Compagnucci
Gilade, Prince of the blood and Captain of the armies of Atridate	soprano castrato	Girolamo Speciali

== Synopsis ==
18th-century Italian operas in the serious style are almost always set in a distant or legendary past and are built around historical, pseudo-historical, or mythological characters.

Time: 1st Century, BC
Place: Asia Minor

The main character of Lucchini's Farnace is based on the life of King Pharnaces II of Pontus, whose conflicts with the Roman Republic eventually led to his death. Farnace has been defeated in battle by Pompeo. In order to avoid seeing his entire family falling into the hands of the enemy, Farnace commands his wife Tamiri to kill their son and then herself, although this never happens. Selinda, Farnace's sister, is taken captive by the Roman Atridate, who falls in love with her, as does the army captain Gilades. Selinda plays them off one another in an attempt to save her brother. Her efforts succeed and everyone is spared.

== Vocal set pieces ==
=== Act 1 ===
Scene 2 – Aria of Pompeo, "Accendi il tuo furore"
Scene 3 – Aria of Atridate, "Non rammentarmi al core"
Scene 4 – Aria of Farnace, "Ti parli in seno amore"
Scene 5 – Aria of Tamiri, "Figlio, sposo, ah già nel petto"
Scene 9 – Aria of Selinda, "Dai rai d'un bel sembiante"
Scene 14 – Aria of Farnace, "Se parto, ben mio"
Scene 15 – Accompanied recitative for Tamiri, "Sarete paghi, o Dei!"
Scene 15 – Aria of Tamiri, "Non sdegnarti, o sposo amato"

=== Act 2 ===
Scene 2 – Aria of Selinda, "Non mi spaventa quel tuo furore"
Scene 3 – Aria of Atridate, "Del mio paterno affetto"
Scene 4 – Aria of Gilade, "Nel suo leggiadro viso"
Scene 5 – Aria of Farnace, "Figlio, mi sento, o Dio"
Scene 8 – Aria of Tamiri, "Se delirar mi fate"
Scene 9 – Aria of Pompeo, "Sol pugnando in mezzo all'armi"
Scene 11 – Aria of Farnace, "Se asperso il suol rimira"

=== Act 3 ===
Scene 2 – Aria of Selinda, "Non vi fidate"
Scene 3 – Aria of Pompeo, "Parti dagli occhi miei"
Scene 4 – Aria of Atribate, "Tu mi bramasti oppresso"
Scene 5 – Duet for Tamiri and Farnace, "Tergi quel cara ciglio"
Scene 7 – Chorus, "Chi serba con alma forte"

== Score ==
The complete score of Farnace is available for study online on the Italian website Internet Culturale in the form of a reproduction of a manuscript once in the possession of the Teatro San Carlo of Naples.
