= Battle of Nicopolis (48 BC) =

48 BC battle between the Kingdom of Pontus and the Roman Republic

Coordinates: 40°18′N 37°50′E

- Part of Caesar's Civil War
Date	December 48 BC
Location	Nicopolis (modern-day Koyulhisar, Sivas, Turkey)
Result	Pontic victory

Belligerents
Roman Republic; Galatia; Kingdom of Cappadocia	Kingdom of Pontus; Kingdom of the Bosporus

Commanders and leaders
Gnaeus Domitius Calvinus	Pharnaces II of Pontus

Units involved
36th Legion; two Galatian Legions; one legion of local troops; 10,000 Capadocian infantry; 1,000 Allied cavalry	Army of Pharnaces

Strength
c. 30,000 infantry c. 1,000 cavalry	c. 20,000

Casualties and losses
67% of force	Unknown

The Battle of Nicopolis was fought in December 48 BC between the army of Pharnaces II of Pontus, the son of Mithdridates VI Eupator, and a Roman army led by Gnaeus Domitius Calvinus.

== Prelude ==
After defeating Pompey and the optimates at Pharsalus, Julius Caesar pursued his opponents to Anatolia and then to Egypt. In the Roman province of Asia, he left Calvinus in command with an army including the 36th Legion, mainly made up of veterans from Pompey's disbanded legions. With Caesar preoccupied in Egypt and the Roman Republic in the midst of a civil war, Pharnaces saw an opportunity to expand his Kingdom of the Bosporus into his father's old Pontic empire. In 48 BC he invaded Cappadocia, Bithynia, and Armenia Parva.

Calvinus concentrated his forces at Comana. These forces consisted of the veteran 36th legion, one recently levied legion of raw recruits (recruited from locals, not Romans), two legions of Galatians (armed, trained, and organized in the Roman style by King Deiotarus of Galatia), 10,000 Capadocian infantry and 1,000 Capadocian cavalry. He also had local auxiliary skirmishers and cavalry from Cilicia. Calvinus advanced toward Pontus in order to strengthen his forces with military settlers hastily recruited from Rome's Pontic colonies. Pharnaces tried to delay Calvinus by diplomatic means but, failing in this, retired to the vicinity of Nicopolis in Armenia Parva. Calvinus brought his army to within seven miles of Nicopolis and, avoiding an ambush set by Pharnaces, deployed his army. Pharnaces now retired to the city and awaited a further Roman advance. Calvinus moved his army closer to Nicopolis and built another camp. Pharnaces intercepted a couple of messengers from Caesar requesting reinforcements from Calvinus. He released them hoping the message would cause the Romans to either withdraw or commit to a disadvantageous battle.

== Battle ==
Calvinus put his army in three lines, the classic Roman Triplex Acies with the 36th on the right, the two Galatian legions in the centre, the newly recruited legion on the left, the Capadocians were held in reserve behind the centre. He then advanced to find Pharnaces' heavy infantry formed in deep ranks between two trenches, fronted by his skirmishers and flanked, beyond the trenches, by numerous cavalry.

Calvinus ordered his men to attack and his lines advanced on the enemy. The 36th defeated their opponents and started to attack the Pontic centre across the trench. Unfortunately for Calvinus, these were the only soldiers in his army to have any success. His recently recruited troops on the left broke and fled after a counterattack.

The Galatians in the centre also broke after engaging the Pontic heavy infantry and fled with the Capadocians. With a large segment of his line now gone, Calvinus could not assault the enemy positions with any hope of victory and had little options but to retreat. The steadiness of the 36th legion saving him from complete annihilation; they formed a fighting circle called Orbis and fought their way to some nearby hills. Although the 36th Legion escaped with light losses, just 250 casualties, Calvinus had lost nearly two thirds of his army by the time he had fully disengaged.

== Aftermath ==
Pharnaces tried to recover his father's old empire, he stormed a number of Roman held and Roman-Allied towns, putting Roman citizens to death, castrating Roman boys and plundering the treasuries. A subsequent rebellion in his rear prevented Pharnaces from invading Roman Asia. His son-in-law Asander led a revolt in the Bosporian kingdom forcing Pharnaces to return north to deal with it. While he was onroute he received word Caesar had arrived in Asia-Minor. Pharnaces decided to deal with Caesar first, turned his army round and marched back. A few weeks later Caesar defeated Pharnaces at the Battle of Zela.
