= Darius of Pontus =

- King of Pontus

King of Pontus
- Reign: c. 37 BC
- Successor: Polemon I
- Father: Pharnaces II of Pontus

Darius of Pontus (reigned 37-37/36 BC) was a monarch of Iranian and Greek Macedonian ancestry. He was the first child born to King Pharnaces II of Pontus and his Sarmatian wife.

He had two younger siblings: a sister named Dynamis and a brother named Arsaces. His paternal grandparents were Mithridates VI, the king of Pontus, and his first wife, his sister Laodice.

Hardly anything is known about Darius. There is only a mention by Appian that he was appointed king of Pontus by Mark Antony.

According to Appian, Mark Antony established client kings in the eastern areas of the Roman empire, which were under his control on condition that they paid a tribute. In Anatolia, Darius, the son of Pharnaces II and grandson of Mithridates VI, was appointed in Pontus, Polemon in a part of Cilicia and Amyntas in Pisidia. This was in 37 BC, before Antony's war with Parthia, when he was making preparations for it, and before he wintered in Athens in the winter of 37/36 BC.

The reign of Darius was short-lived. Strabo wrote that Polemon and Lycomedes of Comana attacked Arsaces, one of the sons of Pharnaces II, in Sagylium because he “was playing the dynast and attempting a revolution without permission from any of the [Roman] prefects …” This stronghold was seized, but Arsaces fled to the mountains where he starved because he was without provisions and water. Three decades earlier, Pompey had ordered the wells to be obstructed by rocks to prevent robbers from hiding in the mountains. Arsaces was captured and killed. Cassius Dio described Polemon as "the king of that part of Pontus bordering on Cappadocia” Presumably, Polemon was appointed as a king of Pontus as a reward for suppressing Arsaces' attempt to assume the throne of Pontus. Pontus, which had become a Roman province, must have been assigned to several client kings who administered its various regions. It is not known whether Darius died and Arsaces was trying to succeed him or whether Arsaces was a usurper. Darius' reign must have lasted less than a year because Cassius Dio referred to Polemon as a king of Pontus when he was involved in Mark Antony's war against the Parthians in 36 BC.
