= Battle of Zela (47 BC) =

Battle between the Roman Republic and the Kingdom of Pontus (47 BC)

Coordinates: 40°18′N 35°53′E

- Part of the Pontic War
- Caesar's campaigns from Rome to Zela
Date	August 2, 47 BC
Location	Zile, present day Turkey
Result	Roman victory

Belligerents
Roman Republic	Kingdom of Pontus

Commanders and leaders
Julius Caesar	Pharnaces II

The Battle of Zela was fought in 47 BC between Julius Caesar and Pharnaces II of the Kingdom of Pontus. The battle took place near Zela (modern Zile), which is now a small hilltop town in the Tokat province of northern Turkey. The battle ended the ambitions of king Pharnaces who wanted to expand his rule over Asia Minor.

Following his swift victory, Caesar famously declared, Veni, Vidi, Vici ("I came, I saw, I conquered"), emphasizing the speed and decisiveness of his triumph.

== Prelude ==
After the defeat of the Ptolemaic forces at the Battle of the Nile, Caesar left Egypt and travelled through Syria, Cilicia, and Cappadocia to fight Pharnaces, son of Mithridates VI.

Pharnaces had defeated Caesar's Legate Gnaeus Domitius Calvinus, and his small Roman and allied army at the Battle of Nicopolis. He then committed atrocities against the Roman prisoners and against any Roman civilians he found in the region. When Pharnaces received word of Caesar's approach, he sent envoys to seek peace, which Caesar refused outright.

Pharnaces had made camp near the town of Zela on the site of a great victory won by his father. His camp was in a strong defensive position, on high ground with a track linking his camp to the town to maintain his supply line. Caesar set up camp on the other side of the valley, but upon his scouts reporting Pharnaces' position, he decided to move his camp to the high ground opposite the Pontic camp. The Romans quickly marched onto the highground and started building a camp. Pharnaces reacted by drawing his army out of camp and put them into battle order. Caesar drew up one line of infantry to protect the workers but kept the rest of his army constructing the new camp. The Pontic army suddenly marched against the Romans.

== Armies ==
Caesar had a detachment (Note: The Romans called this a vexillation.) of the veteran VI Legion, (Note: c. 1000 veteran legionaries) the XXII Legion, (Note: a legion of Galatians, armed, trained, and organized in the Roman style by King Deiotarus of Galatia) the XXXVI Legion (Note: a legion created from Pompeian legionaries who surrendered to Caesar after the Battle of Pharsalus) and several cohorts of survivors of the army of Domitius Calvinus. He also had a small contingent of cavalry. His army numbered c. 15,000 men.

Pharnaces had an army of approximately 20,000 strong, mostly consisting of tribal and levied infantry, but also containing a core of professional soldiers: phalangites, legionaries, and cavalry. Pharnaces also had scythed chariots.

== Order of battle ==
Pharnaces drew up his army with the scythed chariots in front of the first line, which was made up of light infantry and cavalry; the second and third lines held the rest of the infantry.

After Caesar had rushed his men into position, he had the VI on the right, the XXXVI on the left, and the Galatian legion in the centre.

== Battle ==
Pharnaces' army marched down into the valley separating the two armies. Caesar initially laughed at this move, thinking it was merely bravado, as it meant his opponents had to fight an uphill battle. However, Pharnaces' men began climbing up from the valley, and Caesar realized they were serious. Caesar recalled the rest of his men from constructing their camp, and hastily drew them up for battle. Immediately after, the Pontic army engaged Caesar's thin line of legionaries. Pharnaces' scythed chariots broke through the thin defensive line but were met by a hail of pila from Caesar's battle line and were forced to retreat. Caesar launched a counter-attack and drove the Pontic army back down the hill, where it was completely routed. Caesar then stormed and took Pharnaces' camp, completing his victory.

== Aftermath ==
It was a decisive point in Caesar's military career. His five-day campaign against Pharnaces was so swift and complete that, according to Plutarch (writing about 150 years after the battle), he commemorated it with the now-famous Latin words reportedly written to Amantius in Rome: Veni, vidi, vici ("I came, I saw, I conquered"). Suetonius says that the same three words were displayed prominently in the triumph for the victory at Zela. Pharnaces escaped from Zela, first fleeing to Sinope, then back to his Bosporan Kingdom. He started to recruit another army but was soon after defeated and killed by his son-in-law Asander, one of his former governors who had revolted after the Battle of Nicopolis. Caesar made Mithridates of Pergamum the new king of the Bosporan kingdom in recognition of his aid during the Egyptian campaign.
