= Arsaces of Pontus =

King of Pontos and son of Pharnaces II

Arsaces of Pontus (flourished 1st century BC) was a prince from the Kingdom of Pontus. He was a monarch of Iranian and Greek Macedonian ancestry.

Arsaces was the second son and youngest child born to King Pharnaces II of Pontus and his Sarmatian wife. He had two older siblings: a brother called Darius and a sister called Dynamis. His paternal grandparents were the Pontian Monarchs Mithridates VI and his first wife, his sister Laodice. Arsaces was born and raised in the Kingdom of Pontus and the Bosporan Kingdom.

According to Strabo, Arsaces and Darius were guarded by a chief rebel called Arsaces for a time when he held a fortress that was besieged by Polemon I and Lycomedes of Comana. In 37 BC, Darius had died and Arsaces succeeded his brother as king of Pontus. He was made king by Roman Triumvir Mark Antony. According to Strabo, in Arsaces’ reign “he played the role of the sovereign and excited rebellion without the permission of a Roman prefect”.

His reign as king was short, as Arsaces died later in 37 BC or even perhaps in 36 BC. Mark Antony put Polemon I on the Pontian throne as Arsaces’ successor.

== Sources ==
- The Dynastic History of the Hellenistic Monarchies of Asia Minor According to Chronography of George Synkellos by Oleg L. Gabelko
