= Sagylium =

Coordinates: 41°04′41″N 35°20′21″E

Sagylium or Sagylion (Ancient Greek: Σαγύλιον) was a castle situated on a steep rock in the interior of ancient Pontus, which was one of the strongholds of the Pontian kings.

Its site is located near Kaletepe, Asiatic Turkey.
