= Kveli =

Kveli is a Norwegian surname. Notable people with the surname include:

- Laila Kveli (born 1987), Norwegian cross-country skier
- Ola H. Kveli (1921–2003), Norwegian politician
