= Francesco Corselli =

Italian composer

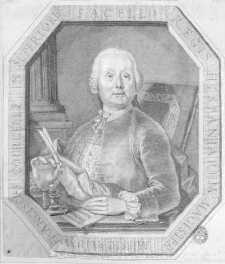
- Francesco Corselli
- Born: 19 April 1705
- Died: 3 April 1778 (aged 72)
- Era: Baroque

Francesco Corselli, sometimes given in the French spelling François Courcelle, (Piacenza, 19 April 1705 - 3 April 1778 in Madrid) was an Italian composer of the pre-classical period born to French parents in Italy.

== Biography ==
Francesco Corselli (Courcelle) was born on 19 April 1705 in Piacenza, Italy from French parents.

He was the director of music for the funerals of Francesco Farnese in Parma in 1724, and Antonio Farnese in 1731, and Kapellmeister at the Church of Santa Maria della Steccata, 1727-1731, and simultaneously at the court of Parma, 1727-33. From this period date his first works: the operas La Venere placata (1731, at the Teatro San Samuele in Venice) and Nino (1732, at the Reggio Theatre ) and various compositions of religious music, Including the oratorio Santa Clotilde (1733 in Parma).

In 1734, he decided to move to Madrid, Spain where he was active as a tenor, harpsichordist and violinist and music teacher of the Royal Infants. In 1737/38, he joined the "Colegio de cantorcillos" until his death. In 1747, he was appointed director of the Theatre at the Buen Retiro, along with two other Italian composers Francesco Corradini and Giovanni Battista Mele. In Madrid, Corselli composed several operas and many pieces of religious music, especially after he was appointed in 1738 Kapellmeister at the Royal Chapel.

Corselli died in Madrid on 3 April 1778.

== Works, editions and recordings ==
- La Venere placata, opera (1731)
- Nino, opera (1732)
- Oratorio de Santa Clotilde, opera (1733)
- Alessandro nelle Indie, opera (1738)
- Il Farnace, opera (1739)
- Achille in Sciro, opera (1744)
- La clemenza di Tito, opera (1747, in collaborazione con Corradini e Mele)
- Responsorium II, Responsorium III, (1750)

Recordings

- Francisco Corselli: Maestro de la Capilla del Rey de España - Opera overtures and marches. "A ti, invisible Ruiseñor Canoro," Christmas cantata. Lamentations - Lectio 2nd in Sabato Sancto, for soprano solo, violins, flutes & trumpets. Lamentación 2nd del Jueves, for soprano solo, violins & muted cellos. "Hasta aquí, Dios amante," cantata for solo soprano, violins, oboes, viola & continuo. Núria Rial, El Concierto Español, Emilio Moreno. Glossa Music
