= Antonio Maria Lucchini =

Antonio Maria Lucchini or Luchini (Venice, c. 1690 – Venice, 1730) was an Italian librettist. His texts were set to music by Antonio Vivaldi, Baldassare Galuppi, Leonardo Vinci, and Rinaldo di Capua, among others.

== Libretti ==
- Foca superbo (set to music by Antonio Lotti, 1716)
- Tieteberga (set to music by Antonio Vivaldi, 1717)
- Giove in Argo (set to music by Antonio Lotti, 1717; set to music by Georg Friedrich Händel, 1739; set to music by Carl Heinrich Graun, 1747)
- Ascanio ovvero Gli odi delusi dal sangue (set to music by Antonio Lotti, 1718)
- L'inganno tradito dall'amore (set to music by Antonio Caldara, 1720)
- Ermengarda (set to music by Tomaso Albinoni, 1723)
- Gli sforzi d'ambizione e d'amore (set to music by Giovanni Porta, 1724)
- Farnace (set to music by Leonardo Vinci, 1724; set to music by Antonio Vivaldi, 1727; set to music by Francesco Corselli, 1739; set to music by Rinaldo di Capua, 1739; set to music by Giuseppe Arena, 1742; set to music by Pietro Alessandro Guglielmi, 1765)
- Dorilla in Tempe (set to music by Antonio Vivaldi, 1726)
- Gl'odi delusi dal sangue (set to music by Baldassare Galuppi e Giovanni Battista Pescetti, 1728)
- L'osservanza della divina legge nel martirio de’ Maccabei (set to music by Francesco Bartolomeo Conti, 1732)
- Il martiro della madre de’ Maccabei (set to music by Francesco Bartolomeo Conti, 1736)
- Sant’Elena al Calvario (set to music by Francesco Bartolomeo Conti, 1736)
- Various madrigal texts
