= Ariobarzanes III of Cappadocia =

Ariobarzanes III
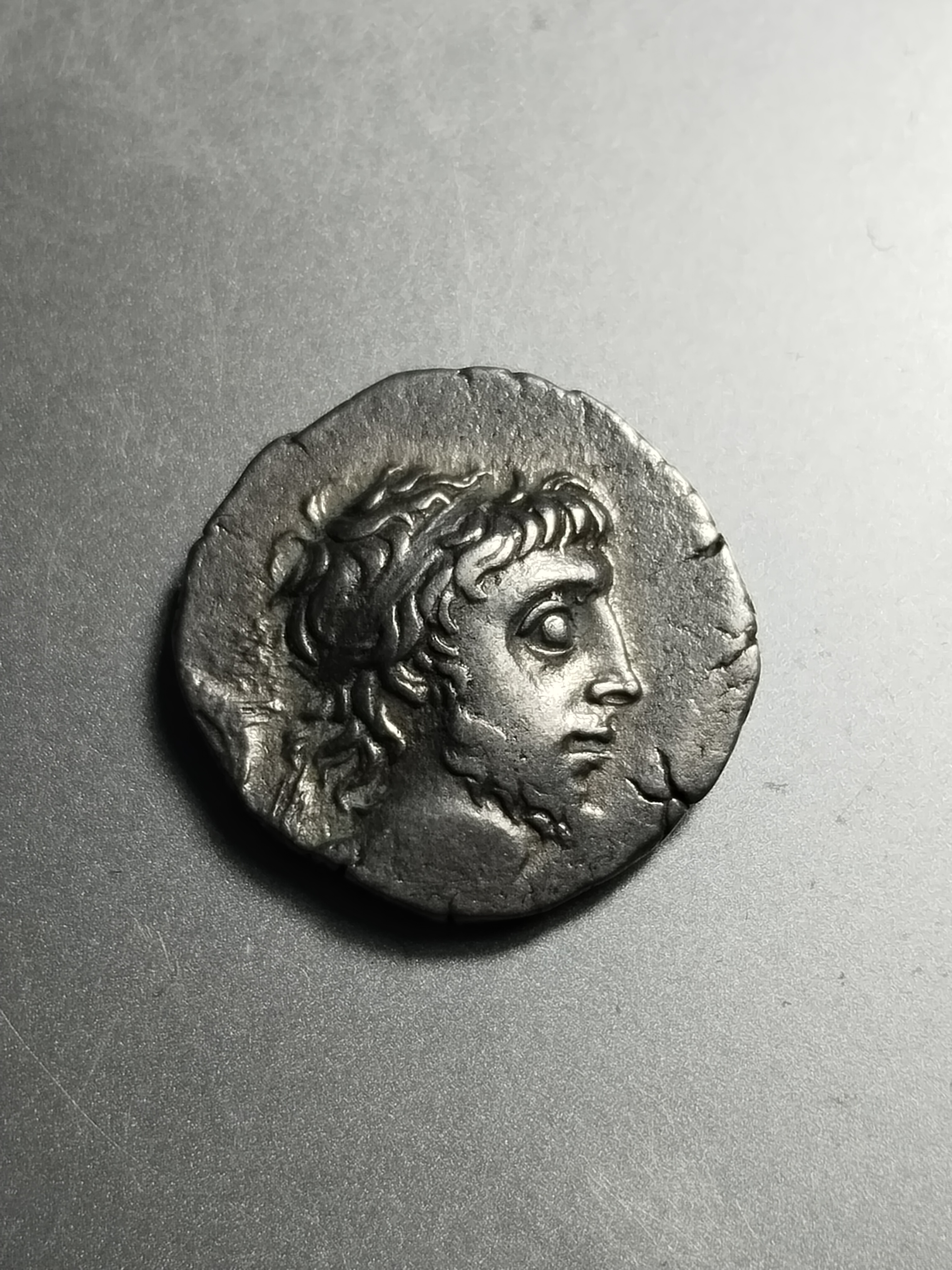
- Bust of Ariobarzanes III as depicted in a silver drachm minted in its name

King of Cappadocia
- Reign: 51 BC to 42 BC.
- Predecessor: Ariobarzanes II of Cappadocia
- Successor: Ariarathes X Eusebes Philadelphos
Names
- Ariobarzanes III Eusebes Philorhomaios
- Father: Ariobarzanes II
- Mother: Athenais Philostorgos II

Ariobarzanes III, surnamed Eusebes Philorhomaios, "Pious and Friend of the Romans" (Ancient Greek: Ἀριοβαρζάνης Εὐσεβής Φιλορώμαιος, Ariobarzánēs Eusebḗs Philorōmaíos), was the king of Cappadocia from ca. 51 BC until 42 BC.

He was of Persian and Greek ancestry. The Roman Senate agreed that he was to be the successor of his father, Ariobarzanes II of Cappadocia; Cicero, Roman governor of Cilicia, noted that he was surrounded by enemies who included his mother, Athenais.

Originally highly supportive of Pompey despite the cost, he was maintained in his position after Julius Caesar won the civil war in Rome, even gaining territory with the addition of Lesser Armenia. The liberator Cassius Longinus had him executed in 42 BC because he would not allow more Roman intervention in his kingdom. He was succeeded by his brother, Ariarathes X of Cappadocia.

Preceded by Ariobarzanes II Philopator	King of Cappadocia; 51 BC – ca. 42 BC	Succeeded by Ariarathes X Eusebes Philadelphos
