= Galatians (people) =

Gallic people of central Anatolia

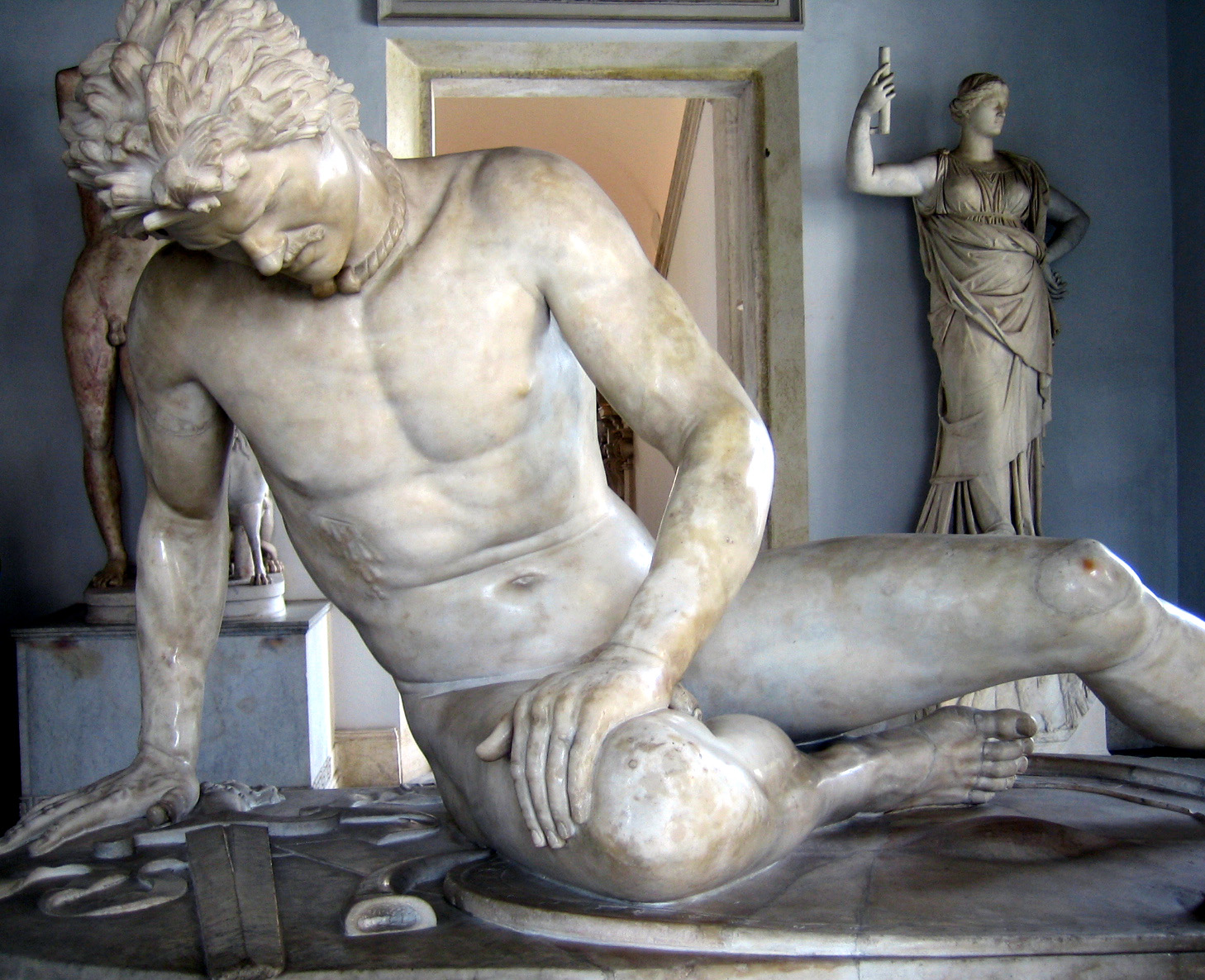
Dying Gaul, Roman copy of a Hellenistic sculpture of a dying Galatian warrior, wearing a torc. Capitoline Museums.

The Galatians (Ancient Greek: Γαλάται, romanized: Galátai; Latin: Galatae, Galati; Greek: Γαλάτες, romanized: Galátes, lit. 'Gauls') and Hellenogalatians (Ancient Greek: Ἑλληνογαλάται; Latin: Gallograeci) were a Celtic people dwelling in Galatia, a region of central Anatolia in modern-day Turkey surrounding Ankara during the Hellenistic period. They spoke the Galatian language, which was closely related to Gaulish, a contemporary Celtic language spoken in Gaul.

The Galatians were descended from Celts who had invaded Greece in the 3rd century BC. The original settlers of Galatia came through Thrace under the leadership of Leogarios and Leonnorios c. 278 BC. They consisted mainly of three Gaulish tribes, the Tectosages, the Trocmii, and the Tolistobogii, but there were also other minor tribes. In 25 BC, Galatia became a province of the Roman Empire, with Ankara (Ancyra) as its capital.

In the 1st century AD, many Galatians were Christianized by Paul the Apostle's missionary activities. Paul's Epistle to the Galatians is addressed to Galatian Christian communities in Galatia and is preserved in the New Testament.

== History ==
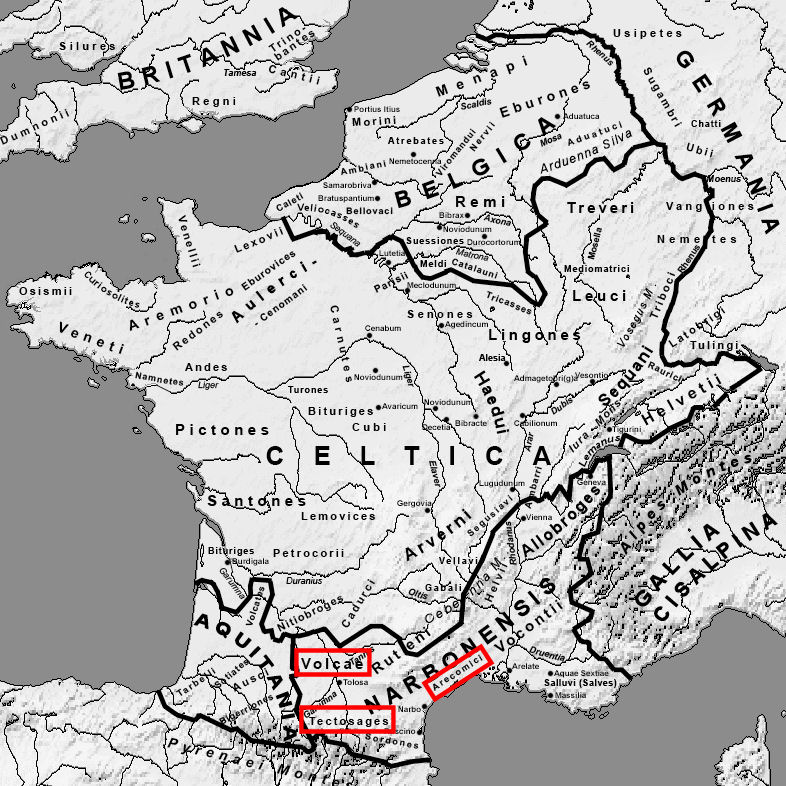
Original location of the Tectosages in Gaul.

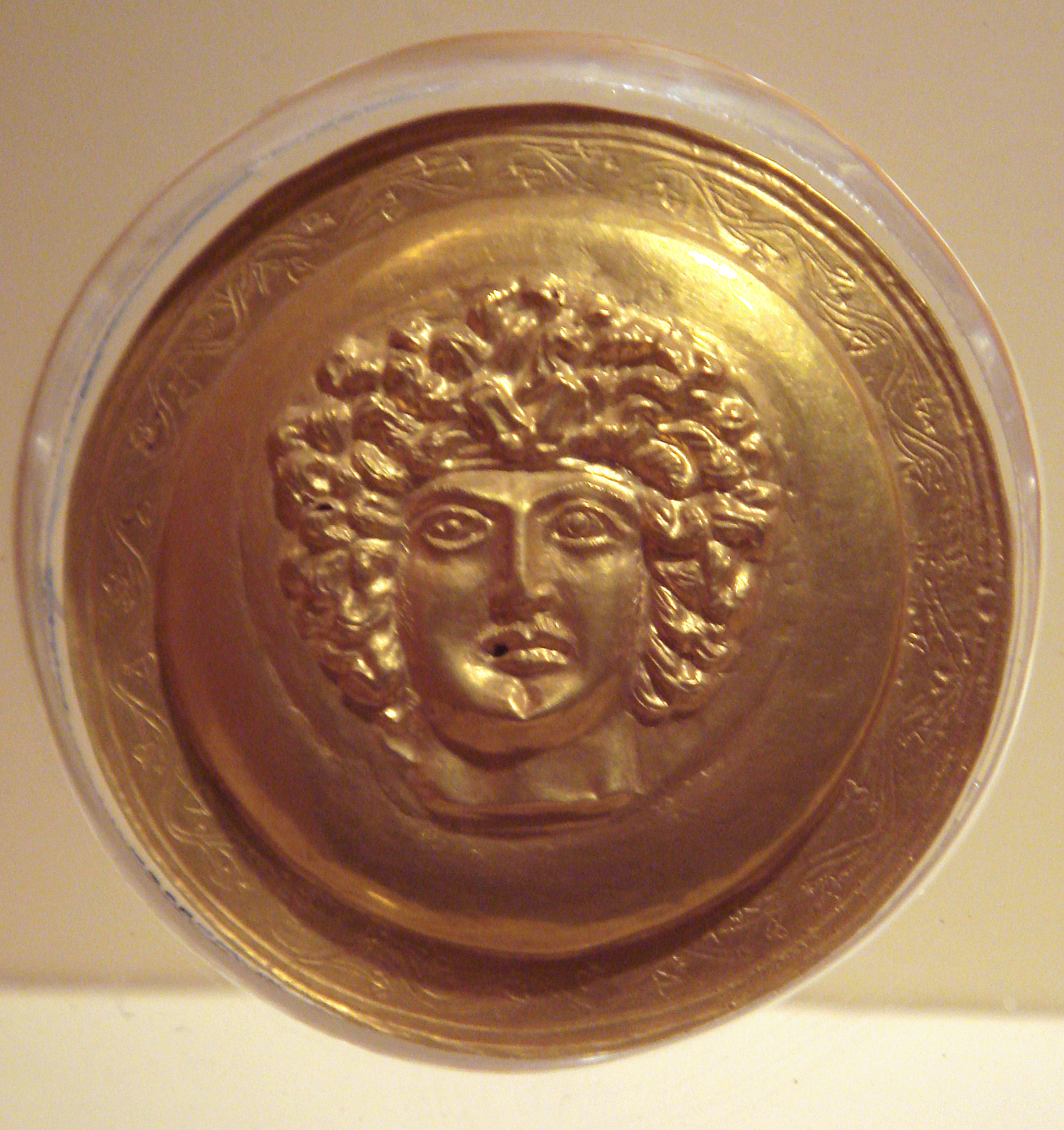
A Galatian's head as depicted on a gold Thracian objet d'art, 3rd century BC. Istanbul Archaeological Museum.

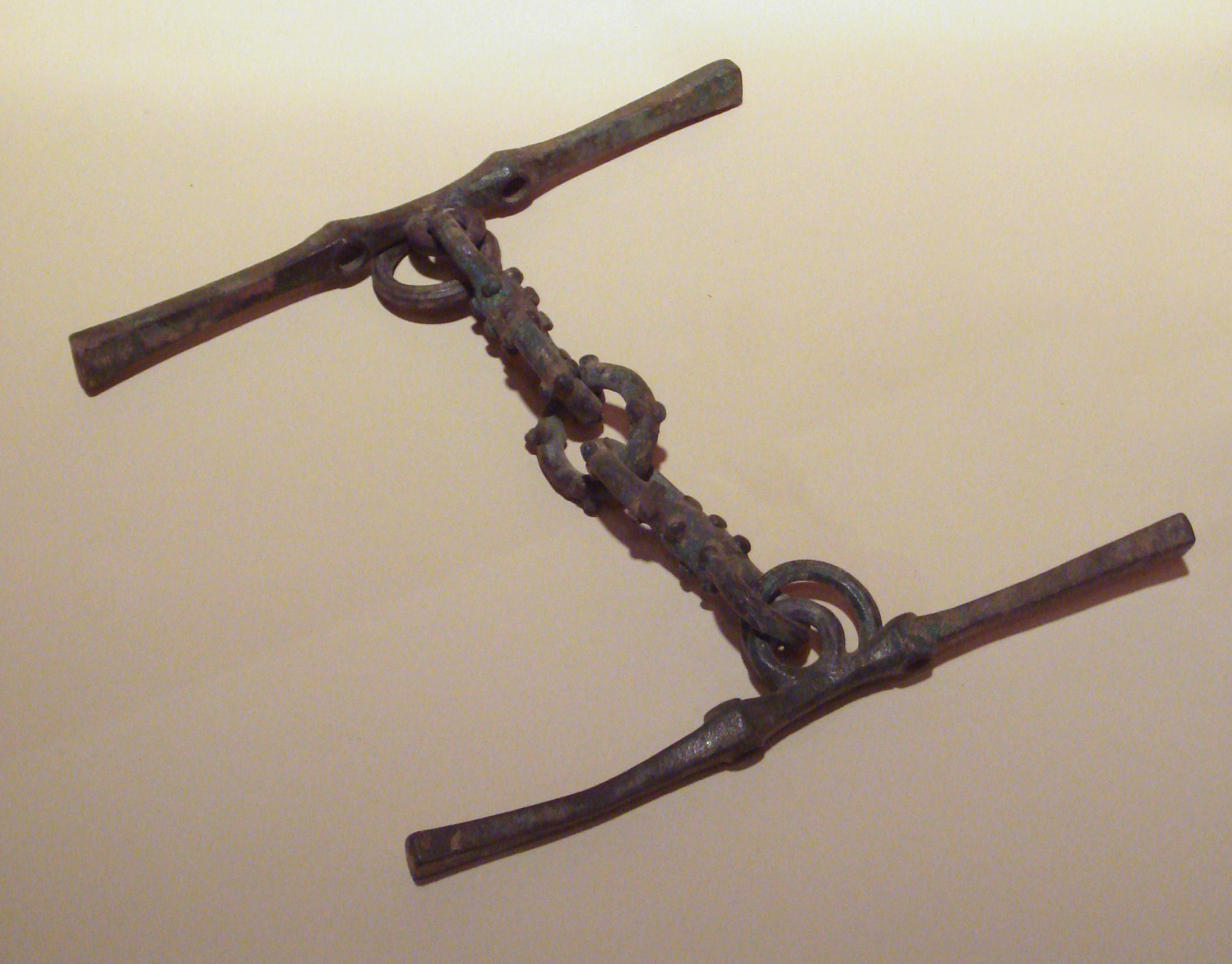
Galatian bronze horse bit, 3rd century BC, Hidirsihlar tumulus, Bolu. Istanbul Archaeological Museum.

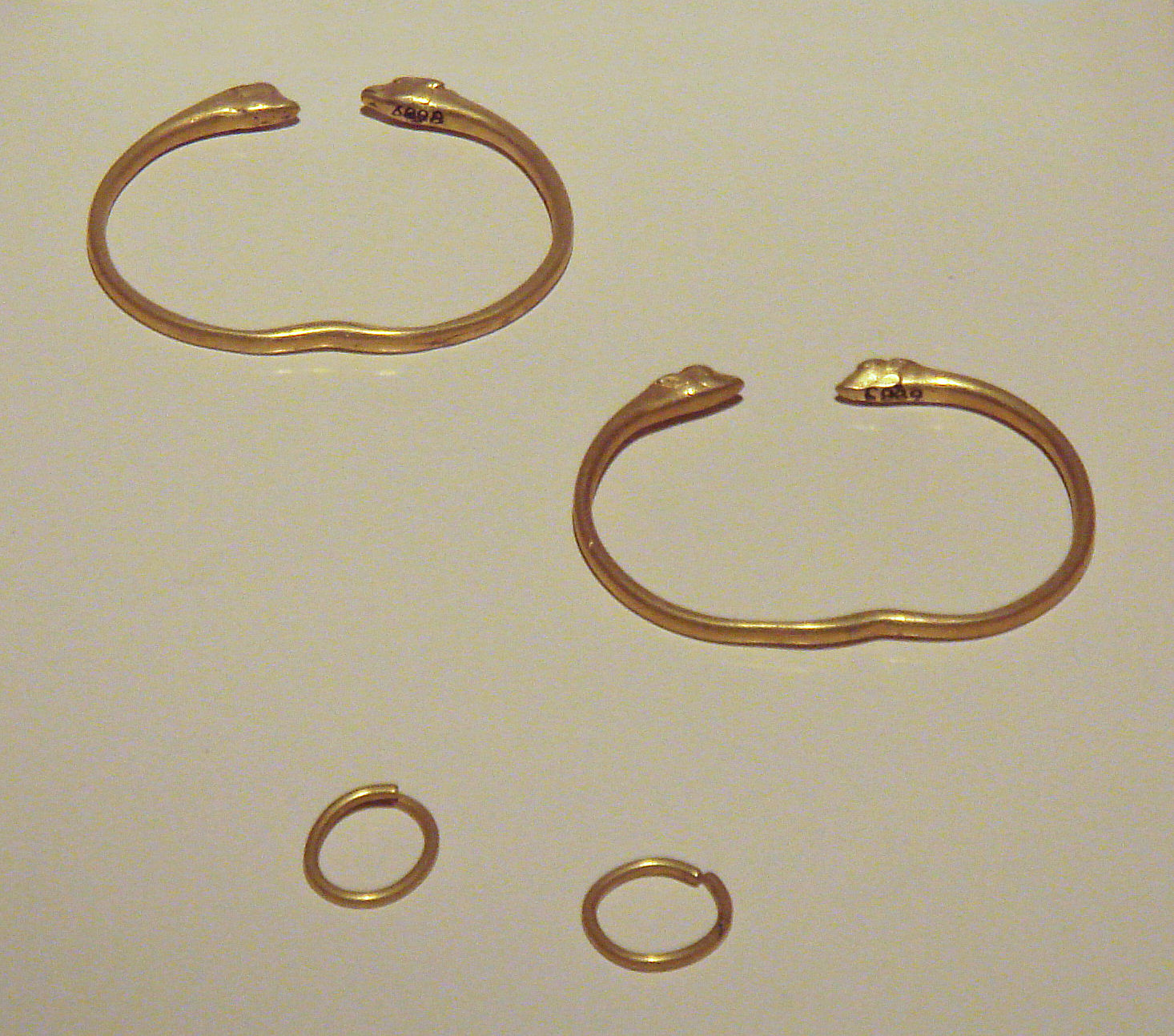
Galatian bracelets and earrings, 3rd century BC, Hidirsihlar tumulus, Bolu. Istanbul Archaeological Museum.

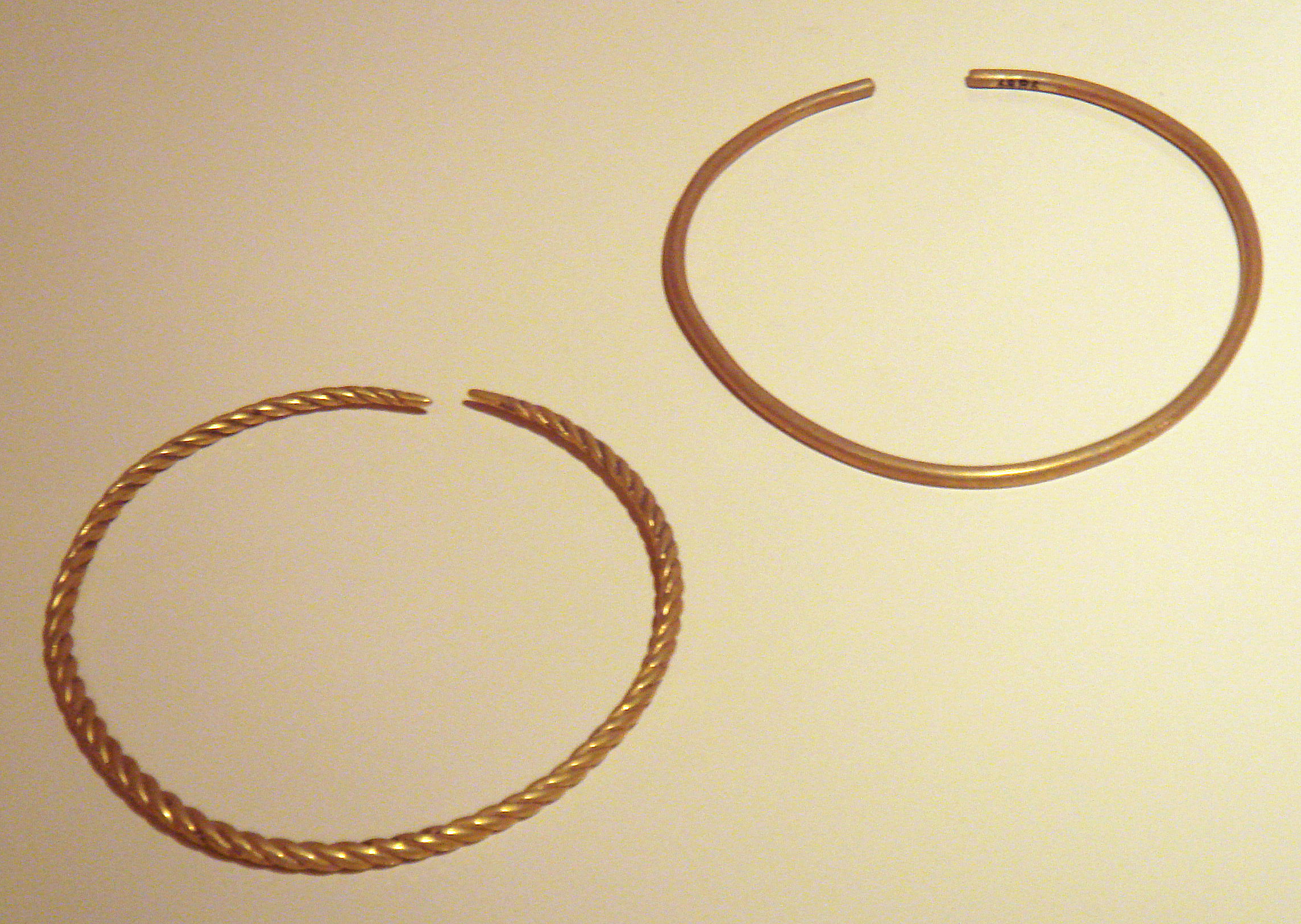
Galatian torcs, 3rd century BC, Hidirsihlar tumulus, Bolu. Istanbul Archaeological Museum.

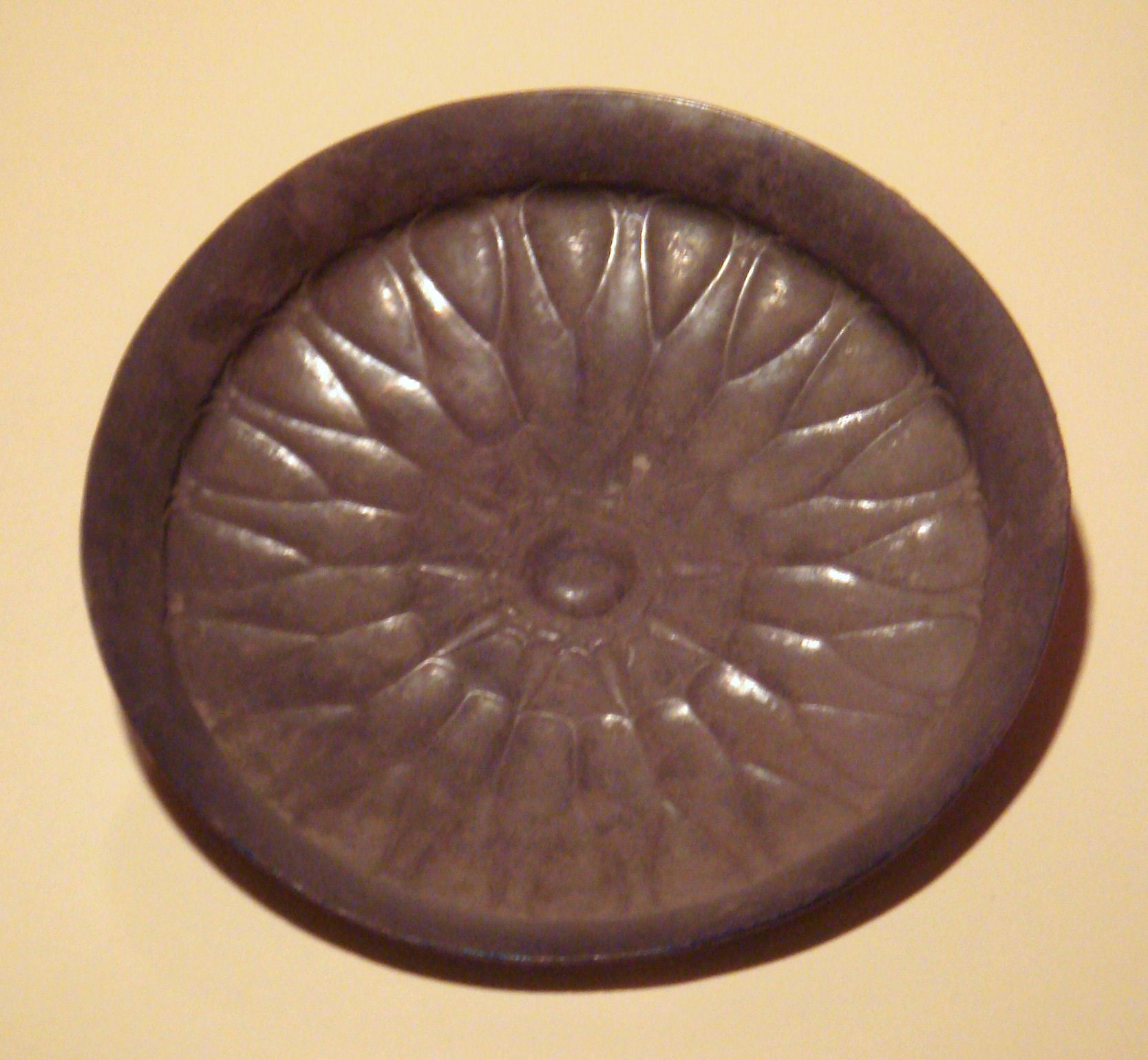
Galatian plate, 3rd century BC, Hidirsihlar tumulus, Bolu. Istanbul Archaeological Museum.

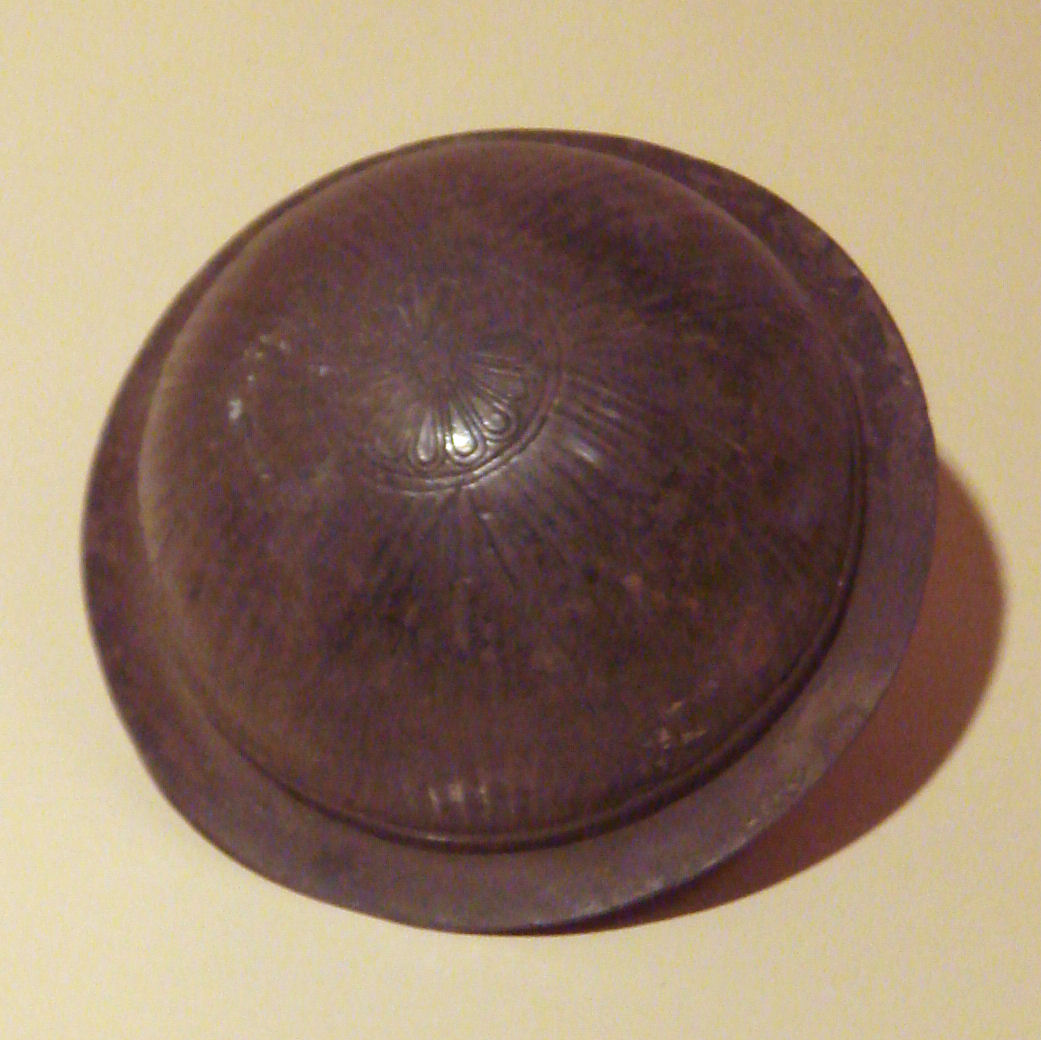
Galatian object, 3rd century BC, Hidirsihlar tumulus, Bolu. Istanbul Archaeological Museum.

Seeing something of a Hellenized savage in the Galatians, Francis Bacon and other Renaissance writers called them Gallo-Graeci ('Gauls settled among the Greeks') and the country Gallo-Graecia, as had the 3rd century AD Latin historian Justin. The more usual term was Ancient Greek: Ἑλληνογαλάται, romanized: Hellēnogalátai of Diodorus Siculus' Bibliotheca historica v.32.5, in a passage that is translated "...and were called Gallo-Graeci because of their connection with the Greeks", identifying Galatia in the Greek East as opposed to Gaul in the West. Suda also used the term Hellenogalatai.

Brennus invaded Greece in 281 BC with a huge war band and was turned back before he could plunder the Temple of Apollo at Delphi. At the same time, another Gaulish group of men, women, and children were migrating through Thrace. They had split off from Brennus' people in 279 BC, and had migrated into Thrace under their leaders Leonnorius and Lutarius. These invaders appeared in Asia Minor in 278–277 BC; others invaded Macedonia, killed the Ptolemaic ruler Ptolemy Ceraunus but were eventually ousted by Antigonus Gonatas, the grandson of the defeated Diadoch Antigonus the One-Eyed.

During the course of the power struggle between Nicomedes I of Bithynia and his brother Zipoetes II, the former hired 20,000 Galatian mercenaries. The Galatians split into two groups headed by Leonnorius and Lutarius, which crossed the Bosporus and the Hellespont respectively. In 277 BC, when the hostilities had ended, the Galatians came out of Nicomedes' control and began raiding Greek cities in Asia Minor while Antiochus I was solidifying his rule in Syria. The Galatians looted Cyzikus, Ilion, Didyma, Priene, Thyatira and Laodicea on the Lycus, while the citizens of Erythras paid them ransom. Either in 275 or 269 BC, Antiochus' army faced the Galatians somewhere on the plain of Sardis in the Battle of the Elephants. In the aftermath of the battle, the Celts settled in northern Phrygia, a region that eventually came to be known as Galatia.

The Seleucids built a series of forts at Thyatira, Akrasos and Nakrason and placed garrisons at Seleucia Sidera, Apamea, Antioch of Pisidia, Laodicea on the Lycus, Hierapolis, Peltos and Vlandos to limit Galatian raids. However, the Galatians expanded beyond those borders, taking control of important cities such as Ancyra (present day Ankara), Pessinus, Tavium, and Gordion. They launched further raids into Bithynia, Heracleia and the Pontus in both 255 and 250 BC. Either in 240 or 230 BC, Attalus I of Pergamon inflicted a heavy defeat on the Galatians at the Battle of the Caecus River. In 216 BC, Prusias I of Bithynia intervened to protect the cities of the Hellespont from Galatian raids. In 190s BC, the Galatians raided Lampsacus and Heraclea Pontica. According to Memnon of Heraclea their goal was to gain access to the sea; however, this claim is disputed by modern historiography.

The constitution of the Galatian state is described by Strabo: comfortably to custom, each tribe was divided into cantons, each governed by a tetrarch with a judge under him, whose powers were unlimited except in cases of murder, which were tried before a council of 300 drawn from the twelve cantons and meeting at a holy place, twenty miles south-west of Ancyra, written in Ancient Greek: Δρυνεμετον, romanized: Drunemeton/Drynemeton, lit. 'holy place of oak'. It is likely it was a sacred oak grove, since the name means 'sanctuary of the oaks' in Transalpine Gaulish: *dru-nemeton, lit. 'holy place of oak' (from drus, lit. 'oak', and nemeton, lit. 'sacred ground'). The local population of Cappadocians were left in control of the towns and most of the land, paying tithes to their new overlords, who formed a military aristocracy and kept aloof in fortified farmsteads, surrounded by their bands.

These Galatians were warriors, respected by Greeks and Romans. They were often hired as mercenary soldiers, sometimes fighting on both sides in the great battles of the times. For years the chieftains and their war bands ravaged the western half of Asia Minor as allies of one or other of the warring princes without any serious check—until they sided with the renegade Seleucid prince Antiochus Hierax, who reigned in Asia Minor. Hierax tried to defeat Attalus I, the ruler of Pergamon (241–197 BC), but instead the Hellenized cities united under Attalus' banner and his armies inflicted several severe defeats upon Hierax and the Galatians in c. 232, forcing them to settle permanently and to confine themselves to the region to which they had already given their name. The theme of the Dying Gaul (a famous statue displayed in Pergamon) remained a favourite in Hellenistic art for a generation.

The king of Attalid Pergamon employed their services in the increasingly devastating wars of Asia Minor; another band deserted from their Egyptian overlord Ptolemy IV after a solar eclipse had broken their spirits.

In 189 BC, Rome sent Gnaeus Manlius Vulso on an expedition against the Galatians, the Galatian War, defeating them. Galatia was henceforth dominated by Rome through regional rulers from 189 BC onward. Galatia declined, at times falling under Pontic ascendancy. They were finally freed by the Mithridatic Wars, during which they supported Rome.

In the settlement of 64 BC, Galatia became a client-state of the Roman Empire, the old constitution disappeared, and three chiefs (wrongly styled 'tetrarchs') were appointed, one for each tribe. But this arrangement soon gave way before the ambition of one of these tetrarchs, Deiotarus, the contemporary of Cicero and Julius Caesar, who made himself master of the other two tetrarchies and was finally recognized by the Romans as 'king' of Galatia.

== Tribes ==
- Tectosages in the centre, with Ancyra as the capital.
- Tolistobogii in the west, with Pessinus as the chief town, sacred to Cybele.
- Trocmi in the east, with Tavium as the chief town.

Each tribal territory was divided into four cantons or tetrarchies. Each of the twelve tetrarchs had under him a judge and a general. A council of the nation consisting of the tetrarchs and three hundred senators was periodically held at Drynemeton.

There were also the:

- Aigosages, between Troy and Cyzicus
- Daguteni, in modern Marmara region around Orhaneli
- Inovanteni, east of the Trocnades
- Okondiani, between Phrygia and Galatia northeast of modern Akşehir Gölü
- Rigosages, unlocated

== Religion ==
Comparatively little is known about Galatian religion, but it can be assumed that it was similar to that of most Celts. The Greek god Telesphorus has attributes not seen in other Greek gods, and it is speculated to have been imported from Galatia.

== See also ==
- Gauls
- Galatia
- List of Kings of Galatia
- Epistle to the Galatians
- Onomaris

== Sources ==
- Sartre, Maurice (2006). Ελληνιστική Μικρασία: Aπο το Αιγαίο ως τον Καύκασο [Hellenistic Asia Minor: From the Aegean to the Caucaus] (in Greek). Athens: Ekdoseis Pataki. ISBN 978-960-16-1756-5.
