= Toutobodiaci =

Subdivision of the Tectosages in ancient Galatia

The Toutobodiaci were a small Celtic tribe of Galatia in central Anatolia, known from a single mention by Pliny. They were a subdivision of the larger Tectosages.

== Name ==
The Toutobodiaci are named only by Pliny and are not otherwise attested.

The name is a Celtic compound of touto- ('people, tribe') and boudi- ('victory, advantage').

== Ethnic identity ==
The Toutobodiaci were a subdivision of the Tectosages, one of the smaller groupings that persisted beside the three dominant Galatian tribes, the Trocmi, the Tectosages and the Tolistobogii.

They are recorded as having occupied a part of Galatia together with the Tectosages. The location given for them in this account conflicts with more reliable evidence from Strabo, which places the Tectosages in central Galatia. They are counted among the Galatian peoples proper, as distinct from Gaulish mercenary bands such as the Aigosages and the Rigosages.
