= Galatian language =

Extinct Celtic language from Asia Minor

Galatian
- Region: Galatia
- Ethnicity: Galatians
- Extinct: 4th century AD (possibly 6th century AD)
- Language family: Indo-European: Celtic; Nuclear or Continental Celtic; Gaulish; Galatian

Language codes
- ISO 639-3: xga
- Glottolog: gala1252
- The Roman province of Galatia

Galatian is an extinct Celtic language once spoken by the Galatians in Galatia, in central Anatolia (Asian part of modern Turkey), from the 3rd century BC up to at least the 4th century AD. Some sources suggest that it was still spoken in the 6th century. Galatian was contemporary with, and closely related to, Gaulish. It has been described as a variant or dialect of the Gaulish language.

== History ==
=== Emergence ===
The Galatian language, based on onomastic evidence (as no texts written in Galatian have yet been discovered), seems to have closely resembled Gaulish of western and central Europe. The language was introduced to Anatolia in the 3rd century BC, when Celtic tribes – notably the Tectosages, Trocmii, and Tolistobogii – migrated south from the Balkans. According to the Greek historian Strabo, the Tectosages of Anatolia were related to the Volcae Tectosages of Gaul; the parent tribe of both branches, the Volcae, originally lived in central Europe.

=== Contemporary Roman sources ===
Sometime in AD 48–55, the Apostle Paul wrote his Epistle to the Galatians in Greek, the medium of communication in much of the Roman Empire. This may mean that Galatians at the time were already bilingual in Greek, as St. Jerome later reports. However, scholars are divided as to whether Paul was writing to Greek Galatians or to the Hellenized descendants of the Celtic Galatians.

Lucian of Samosata recorded in circa AD 180 that the prophet Alexander of Abonoteichus was able to find Celtic-speaking interpreters for his oracles in Paphlagonia (immediately northeast of Galatia).

The physician Galen of Pergamon in the late 2nd century AD complained that the commonly spoken Greek of his day was being corrupted by borrowings of foreign words from languages such as Galatian.

In the 4th century, St. Jerome (Hieronymus) wrote in a comment to Paul the Apostle's Epistle to the Galatians that "apart from the Greek language, which is spoken throughout the entire East, the Galatians have their own language, almost the same as the Treveri". The capital of the Treveri was Trier, where Jerome had settled briefly after studying in Rome.

=== Survival into Early Medieval period ===
In the 6th century AD, Cyril of Scythopolis suggested that the language was still being spoken in his own day when he related a story that a monk from Galatia was temporarily possessed by Satan and unable to speak; when he recovered from the "possession", he could respond to the questioning of others only in his native Galatian tongue.

== Vocabulary ==
Of the language only a few glosses and brief comments in classical writers and scattered names on inscriptions survive. Altogether they add up to about 120 words, including place and personal names. Scattered vocabulary terms mentioned by Greek authors include ἀδάρκα (adarka), a type of plant; αδες (ades), "feet"; βαρδοί (bardoi), "singing poets, bards"; μάρκα (marka), "horse" and τριμαρκισία (trimarkisia), "three-horse battle group".

=== Common nouns ===
Only three common nouns are certainly attested, and only two of them of Celtic origin. All are attested in Greek sources and are declined as if Greek.

- τασκός, taskos, "badger" (cf. Moritasgus)
- δρουγγός, droungos, "snout, nose"
- ὗς, hus, "kermes oak"

Both taskos and droungos are given by Epiphanius of Salamis in his Panarion in an effort to elucidate the name of the gnostic sect of the Tascodrugites. Although he has the correct meaning of droungos, he gives taskos as meaning "peg". It almost certainly means "badger". The word hus is not of Celtic origin, but was borrowed into Galatian from another language.

=== Personal names ===
The attested Galatian personal names are similar to those found elsewhere in the ancient Celtic-speaking world. Many are compound names containing common Celtic roots such as *brog-, "country, territory" (cf. Old Irish mruig, Welsh and Breton bro; cognate with Latin margo and Gothic marka), *epo-, "horse" (Old Irish ech, Welsh eb- [in ebol "foal" and the compound ebrwydd "swift"], Breton ebeul, foal), *māro- (cf. Gaulish -māros, Old Irish mór, Welsh mawr, Breton meur) "great", and *rig(o)-, "king" (cf. Gaulish -rīx/-reix, Irish rí, Welsh rhi; cognate with Gothic -reiks, Latin rēx). Examples include:

- Ἀδιατόριξ (Adiatorīx)
- Βιτοριξ (Bitorīx)
- Βρογιμάρος (Brogimāros)
- Κάμμα (Cāmmā)
- Δομνείωυ (Domneiū)
- Ἐπόνη (Eponī)
- Ολοριξ (Olorīx)
- Σμερτομάρα (Smertomārā)
- Τεκτομάρος (Tectomāros)

Tribal names include Ambitouti (Old Irish imm-, Welsh am "around"; Old Irish tuath, Welsh tut, "tribe"), Ριγόσαγες (Rigosages, "King-Seekers"; cf. Old Irish saigid "goes towards, seeks out", Welsh haeddu, verbal suffix -ha- "seeking"), and Τεκτόσαγες (Tectosages, cf. the related Volcae Tectosages tribe of Gaul, "Travel-seekers"; Old Irish techt, "going, proceeding", Welsh taith, "journey, voyage").

=== Divine names ===
Attested divine names include βουσσουριγίος (Bussurīgios) and Σουωλιβρογηνός (Suolibrogēnos), both identified with the Greek king of the gods Zeus, and Ούινδιεινος (Uindieinos), perhaps the tutelary god of the Tolistobogian town Ούινδια (Uindia).

=== Place names ===
Attested place names include Acitorīgiāco ("[Settlement of] Acitorīx"; compare Acitodunum in Gaul), Άρτικνιακόν (Articniācon, "[Settlement of] Articnos" ["Bear-son"]), Δρυνέμετον (Drunemeton; < Proto-Celtic *dru- "oak" and, by extension, "great"; cf. Old Irish druí, Welsh dryw [< *dru-wid-s], "druid, wise man" [literally "greatly wise"], Old Irish neimed, Welsh nyfed "holy place, [sacred] grove"), the meeting place of the Galatian tetrarchs and judges, and Ούινδια (Uindia "Fair/White/Holy Place"; Old Irish finn, Welsh gwyn [masc.], gwen [fem.] "fair, white; holy").
