= List of kings of Galatia =

Galatia was a region of Central Anatolia settled by the Gauls after their invasions in the mid-3rd century BC. From then until 62 BC, the Galatians ruled themselves by means of decentralized Tetrarchies, but in 62, the Romans established a Kingdom of Galatia, which lasted around 35 years.

== Kings of Galatia, 62–25 BC ==
Name	Lifespan	Reign start	Reign end	Notes	Family	Image
Deiotarus		62 BC	40 BC	Co-ruler with Brogitarus		
Brogitarus		63 BC	50 BC	Co-ruler with Deiotarus		
Castor		40 BC	36 BC			
Amyntas	died 25 BC	37 BC	25 BC			Depiction of Amyntas on a Galatian coin
