= Gaius Julius Bassus =

1st-century AD Roman senator

Gaius Julius Bassus (c. 45 – aft. 101 AD) was a Roman senator. He was quaestor, and later governor of Bithynia and Pontus for the term 100/101; two inhabitants of that public province indicted him in the Senate for corruption, and Pliny the Younger successfully defended him from these charges.

Bassus was the younger son of Gaius Julius Severus (b. ca 25), an aristocrat from Akmonia at Galatia, and paternal grandson of Artemidoros of the Trocmi, an aristocrat of Galatia, (son of Amyntas, Tetrarch of the Trocmi, King of Galatia), and his wife a member of the Tectosagii (daughter of Amyntas, Tetrarch of the Tectosagii). His older brother was Gaius Julius Severus, a Tribune in Legio VI Ferrata.

He was the father of Gaius Julius Quadratus Bassus, suffect consul in 105.

== Sources ==
- Christian Settipani, Les Ancêtres de Charlemagne (France: Éditions Christian, 1989).
- Christian Settipani, Continuite Gentilice et Continuite Familiale Dans Les Familles Senatoriales Romaines, A L'Epoque Imperiale, Mythe et Realite. Linacre, UK: Prosopographica et Genealogica, 2000. ILL. NYPL ASY (Rome) 03-983.
