= Gorbeus =

City in ancient Galatia

Coordinates: 39°41′41″N 32°52′28″E

Gorbeus or Gorbius or Gorbeious (Ancient Greek: Γορβειοῦς), or Corbeus or Korbeous (Κορβεοῦς), was a city of the Tectosages, in ancient Galatia. Gorbeus was the residence of Castor the son of Saocondarius. Saocondarius married the daughter of Deiotarus, who murdered his son-in-law and his own daughter, destroyed the castle, and ruined the greater part of Gorbeus. The name Corbeus occurs in the Antonine Itinerary and in the Tabula Peutingeriana, but the latter is quite unintelligible. In the Antonine Itinerary, Corbeus is placed between Ancyra, and a place called Rosologiacum, 20 M. P. from Ancyra and 12 M. P. from Rosologiacum.

Its site is located near Oğulbey, Asiatic Turkey.
