= Peium =

Fortress in ancient Galatia

Coordinates: 40°09′27″N 32°03′29″E

Peium or Peion (Ancient Greek: Πήιον), also known as Peon, was a fortress of the Tolistoboii in ancient Galatia, where Deiotarus kept his treasures.

Its site is located near Tabanlıoğlu Kale, Asiatic Turkey.
