= Aigosages =

Gaulish people of the early Hellenistic period

The Aigosages (Ancient Greek: Αἰγοσάγες; also Aegosages) were a Gallic people of the early Hellenistic period, known almost solely from Polybius. A tribal group from Thrace, they were brought across the Hellespont in 218 BC by Attalus I of Pergamon to serve as mercenaries in his war against the Seleucid rebel Achaeus. After a mutiny they were settled on the Hellespont, where they raided the Troad and besieged Ilium, and they were destroyed by Prusias I of Bithynia about 216 BC.

== Name ==
They are named as Aigosages (Αἰγοσάγες) by Polybius.

The name is formed with Gaulish the suffix sagi- ('seeking'), as in the Galatian tribes Tectosages and Rigosages. The meaning of the first element is uncertain.

== History ==
Unlike the Tolistobogii, Tectosages and Trocmi who settled permanently in Galatia, the Aigosages formed a separate body recruited from south-eastern Europe.

The Aigosages were settled in Thrace, where they may have been among the Celts established since the great expedition into the Balkans, perhaps refugees from the kingdom of Tylis, which collapsed in 218 BC. In that year Attalus I of Pergamon, faced with the resurgence of Seleucid power under Antiochus III and the revolt of his kinsman Achaeus, recruited the tribe in Thrace and brought it across the Hellespont to act as mercenaries, much as Nicomedes I of Bithynia had brought the first Galatians into Asia some sixty years earlier. The aim was to win back the cities of Aeolis that had been intimidated into revolt by Achaeus.

The campaign was at first successful, most communities rejoining Attalus with little resistance. At the river Megistus, however, a lunar eclipse, datable to 1 September 218 BC, caused the mercenaries to mutiny. The tribe had crossed over in its entirety, accompanied by a slow-moving baggage train of wives, children and possessions, and was ill-suited to a rapid campaign. Despite the mutiny, Attalus settled the Aigosages on the Hellespont, in fulfilment of the obligations he had entered into.

From there the Aigosages conducted raids of their own in the Troad and along the Hellespont, against which Attalus took no action. In 217 or 216 BC they besieged Ilium, but the siege failed, the walls built by Lysimachus holding, and the city was not sacked. Soon afterwards Prusias I of Bithynia annihilated the tribe, the force he sent against them numbering 4,000. Polybius synchronises the destruction with the consular elections of Varro and Paullus and the flight of Philip V from a Roman squadron near Apollonia, that is about 216 BC, though the precise date is disputed and proposals range from 217 to 212 BC.
