= Blucium =

Fortress in ancient Galatia

Coordinates: 40°11′50″N 32°36′12″E

Blucium or Bloukion (Ancient Greek: Βλούκιον) was a fortress of the Tolistoboii in ancient Galatia. It was the residence of Deiotarus, in defence of whom Cicero made an oration, addressed to the Dictator Caesar. In the text of Cicero, the name is read Luceium, and, accordingly, some translators amend Strabo by writing Λούκειον.

Its site is located near Karalar, Asiatic Turkey.
