= Adobogiona =

Celtic princess

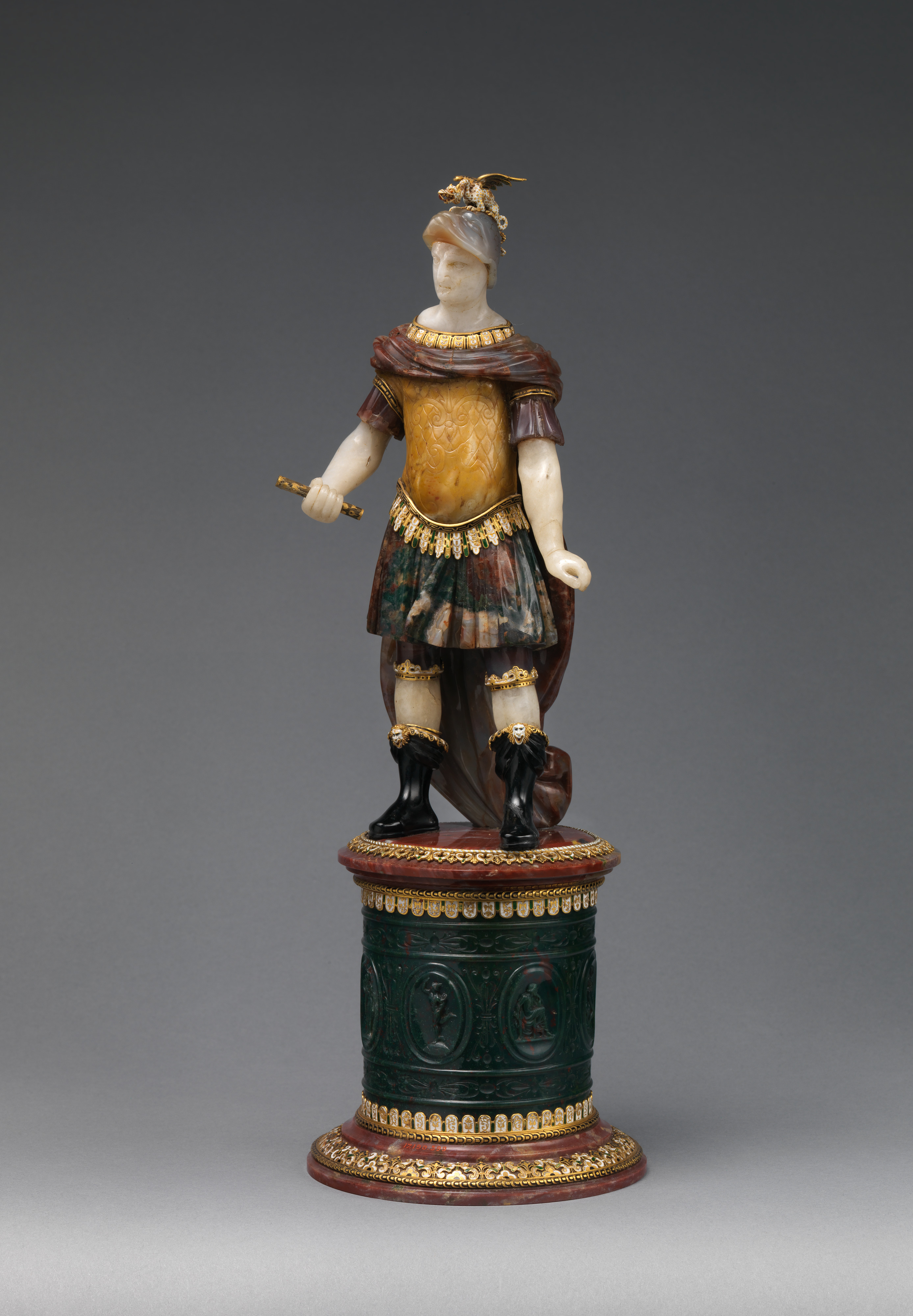
- Born: c. 80 BC; Anatolia
- Died: c. 50 BC
- Occupation: Aristocrat
- Known for: Anatolian Representative
- Spouses: Brogitarus of Galatia & Castor Tarcondarius
- Children: Amyntas of Galatia & Castor Saecondarius
- Parent(s): Deiotarus of Galatia & Berenice, Princess of Pergamon

Adobogiona (fl. c. 80 BC – c. 50 BC) was a Celtic princess from Anatolia. She was the daughter of king Deiotarus of Galatia and Berenice, Princess of Pergamon, probably a daughter of king Attalus III of Pergamon.

Adobogiona married Brogitarus, King of Galatia, who reigned concurrently with his father-in-law. They were the parents of Amyntas of Galatia, a tetrarch of the Trocmi tribe and king of Galatia.

Adobogiona was honoured by a surviving inscription discovered on the island of Lesbos and a portrait head of her has been discovered at Pergamon.

== Sources ==
- S. Mitchell, Anatolia: Land, Men and Gods in Asia Minor, Vol. I (1956).
- Ton Derks/Nico Roymans, Ethnic Constructs in Antiquity: The Role of Power and Tradition, Amsterdam: Amsterdam University Press, 2009, p. 137.
