= Rigosages =

Gaulish mercenary people known from Polybius

The Rigosages (Ancient Greek: Ῥιγοσάγες; also Rhigosages) were a Gallic people known from a single mention by Polybius. They served as mercenaries in the army of the Seleucid king Antiochus III in 221 BC, and are not otherwise attested.

== Name ==
They are mentioned as Rigosages (Ῥιγοσάγες) only by Polybius (2nd century BC), who records them as mercenaries in the Seleucid army.

The name is formed with the Gaulish suffix sagi- ('seeking'), as in the Galatian tribes Tectosages and Aigosages. The meaning of the first element is uncertain. Xavier Delamarre has proposed to see the Gaulish rix ('king'), and tentatively translates the name as 'those who seek a king'.

== History ==
Like the Aigosages, whom Attalus I brought across the Hellespont, the Rigosages formed a band of mercenaries rather than one of the Galatian peoples settled permanently in Galatia in the early 3rd century BC.

They fought as mercenaries in the army of the Seleucid king Antiochus III in 221 BC. Nothing further is recorded of them.
