= Büyüknefes =

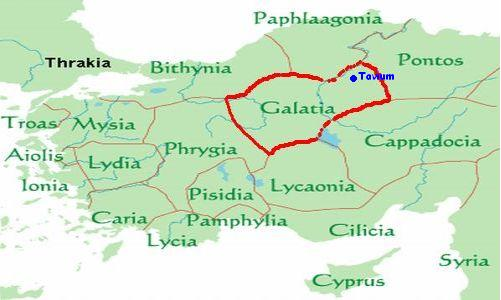
Büyüknefes (Tavium)

Büyüknefes is a town established on the ruins of Tavium, capital city of the Galatians. There is a fountain located in the middle of the village which, according to its inscription, dates back to 1843-1844. It is a rectangular fountain, made of grooved stone. It is also constructed out of ancient stone and re-used materials.
