= Volcae =

Ancient Celtic people of central Europe

The Volcae (Latin: Volcae; Ancient Greek: Οὐόλκαι, Ouólkai) were a Celtic people, or group of peoples, attested from the 3rd century BC in widely separated parts of the Celtic world. Modern scholarship places the grouping's formation in central Europe, from where mobile bands bearing the name spread both eastward, into the middle Danube basin, Pannonia and ultimately Anatolia, and westward into southern Gaul. Two confederations, the Volcae Arecomici and the Volcae Tectosages, are recorded in Gaul, while a branch of the Tectosages became one of the three peoples of the Galatian confederation in Asia Minor. The tribal name was borrowed into Germanic as *walhaz, which later came to denote Celtic and then Romance speakers.

== Name ==
They are mentioned as Volcis and Volcarum by Caesar (mid-1st c. BC), as Ou̓ólkai (Οὐόλκαι) by Strabo (early 1st c. AD) and Ptolemy (2nd c. AD), and as Volce on the Tabula Peutingeriana (4–5th c. AD).

Most modern Celtologists regard the tribal name Uolcae (sing. Uolcos) as stemming from a Gaulish noun uolcos ('hawk, falcon'), which can be compared with the Welsh gwalch ('hawk, rascal' > 'fighter'). In particular, the Gaulish personal name Catu-uolcos has an exact parallel in the Welsh cadwalch ('hero, champion, warrior'), itself from an earlier Old Brittonic *katu-wealkos ('battle-hawk'). (Note: The Gaulish stem uolc- can also be found in many personal names, such as Uolcius, Uolcenius, Uolcenia, Uolcinius, Uolcacius, Uolciani, and Uolcanus. The Old English wealc- ('hawk'), which has no known cognate in other Germanic languages, was most likely borrowed from Old Brittonic *wealkos.) The etymology of those forms remains obscure. Xavier Delamarre has proposed to derive Gaulish uolcos, alongside Latin falcō ('falcon') and falx ('hook, sickle'), from a stem *ǵhwol-k-, itself based on Proto-Indo-European (PIE) *ǵʷhel- ('bend, curve'). In this view, the animal may have been named after the shape of his beak, just like the Ancient Greek harpē designates both a sickle and a bird of prey.

Alternatively, the name Uolcae has been derived by some scholars from the PIE name of the wolf, *wḷkʷos. According to Ranko Matasović, however, this is unlikely since Gaulish and Brittonic would have preserved the o-grade *wolkʷo-. (Note: Matasović argues that descendants of Proto-Celtic *ulkʷos ('bad, evil' < PIE *wḷkʷos 'wolf') rather include Lepontic Ulkos and Old Irish olc ('bad, evil').) Delamarre also finds it doubtful since Celtic sound laws would have turned PIE *wḷkʷos into Old Irish **flech (rather than olc), and into Gaulish **ulipos (rather than uolcos) after the P-Celtic sound shift. (Note: John T. Koch derives Old Irish olc from a Proto-Celtic form *elko- ~ *olko-, which may be compared with Old Norse illr (from Proto-Germanic *elhja- < Pre-Germanic *elkyo-; cf. the Finnish loanword elkiä 'mean, malicious'); he proposes that reflexes of PIE *wḷkʷos ('wolf') include Old Irish foilc (from a 9th-century poem) and Old Welsh gueilc[h] (from the poem Y Gododdin).)

After Volcae Tectosages settled in the Hercynian forest (Central Europe), neighbouring Germanic tribes designated them by the name *walhaz, a loanword from Gaulish uolcos that came to refer more generally to Celtic and Romance speakers in medieval Germanic languages (e.g. Welsh, Waals, Vlachs).

== Geography ==
The Volcae were not a single tribe. Venceslas Kruta characterises them as a people, or group of peoples, of probably composite character and marked mobility, recorded from the 3rd century BC at several points of the Celtic world.

The region in which the grouping took shape is placed in central Europe, although its precise location is disputed. Kruta sets their formation in the central plains of Bohemia and adjacent Moravia, lands repopulated about the beginning of the 4th century BC by disparate groups out of which a powerful new body emerged. Karl Strobel instead places the core of the Volcae in Thuringia and north-eastern Bavaria, and distinguishes it from the interior of the Hercynian forest proper, between the Bohemian Forest and the Ore Mountains and Sudetes, which he assigns to the Boii. (Note: On Strobel's reading the name Hercynia silva in the ancient sources is a geographical catch-all for the wooded uplands north of the Danube between the Rhine and Slovakia, rather than a precise territory.)

Caesar reports a section of the Volcae Tectosages settled around the Hercynian forest, in the most fertile lands of Germania, where they remained in the mid-1st century BC and passed for the only Gaulish people able to hold their ground against the Germani. The Volcae associated with the Hercynian forest are also supposed to have moved from Moravia towards Upper Silesia. The name of the Hercynian forest itself is of undisputed Celtic form.

To the south-east the name survives in the Volcae Paludes ('marshes of the Volcae'), a wetland region of southern Pannonia occupied in the 3rd century BC. Kruta places it north of the confluence of the Drava and the Danube, with Celtic settlement at Batina and Gajić. Karl Strobel locates it between the Sava and the Bosut and north of Cibalae.

== History ==
=== Origins in central Europe ===
The grouping out of which the Volcae emerged was drawn into a major phase of movement in the 4th century BC, its dominant confederation being the Tectosages. In a first stage these bands extended their range into the central Danube basin, where they shared fully in the material development of the 4th century. Their expansion has been set against the wider Celtic migrations that emptied parts of central Germany of population about 400 to 380 BC.

=== Eastward migration: the Danube and Galatia ===
A part of the Volcae, led by Tectosagan bands, moved into southern Pannonia and gained a footing in the country between the Drava and the Sava. A considerable portion of the people settled there, an event preserved in the name of the Volcae Paludes ('marshes of the Volcae'). The group that remained between the Sava and the Drava was in time absorbed into the Scordisci.

In 279 BC a warrior band of these Tectosages joined the expedition of Brennos against Greece, which forced the pass of Thermopylae and advanced on Delphi. (Note: On Karl Strobel's reconstruction the band that joined Brennos came from the Pannonian Tectosages rather than from those of Gaul.) After the failure of the campaign in 278 BC, part of the Tectosages passed into Thrace and then, about 277 BC, crossed into Asia Minor in the service of Nicomedes I of Bithynia. They settled in central Anatolia, where the Tectosages became one of the three peoples of the Galatian confederation, beside the Tolistobogii and the Trocmi. Whether the Tolistobogii and Trocmi themselves belonged to the Volcae cannot be determined.

Possible routes of migrations of the Volcae

The relationship between the Tectosages of Gaul and those of Asia Minor was already a matter of ancient speculation. Drawing on Posidonius, Strabo held that the eastern Tectosages had come from the homonymous Volcae Tectosages around Tolosa and stressed the identity of the two. Modern scholarship reverses the direction of this account. Kruta and Karl Strobel place the formation of the Volcae in central Europe and treat the bands that reached Gaul, the Danube and Anatolia as offshoots of that nucleus. Altay Coşkun goes further, regarding both the derivation of all the eastern Galatians from the Tectosages and the parallel claim that the Tolistobogii and Trocmi sprang from homonymous Gaulish tribes as improbable, and Strabo's unitary picture as a deliberate schematism.

A related tradition held that the gold later seized at Tolosa derived from the plunder of Delphi, carried home by the Tectosages, and that this booty, laid under a curse, was the Gold of Tolosa (aurum Tolosanum). The version goes back to Timagenes. It was rejected already in antiquity by Posidonius, who held the Tolosan treasure to be of local origin: the sanctuary at Delphi, despoiled earlier by the Phocians, had held no such riches. Strabo preferred this explanation. The treasure itself, gold and silver said to have lain in sacred pools, was taken when the consul Quintus Servilius Caepio stormed Tolosa in 106 BC.

=== Westward migration: southern Gaul ===
The Volcae assumed in the central Danube basin in the 4th century BC moved west in the first half of the 3rd century BC, crossing by way of the upper Rhine into Gaul as two confederations, the Tectosages and the Arecomici. In 218 BC they appear on both banks of the lower Rhône as a gens valida Volcarum, which withdrew before the army of Hannibal and tried in vain to bar his crossing of the river. During the 2nd century BC the Arecomici, the smaller of the two, were confined to Languedoc with their centre at Nemausus, while the Tectosages pushed south-west towards the upper Garonne and Tolosa. Their arrival brought Danubian material into southern Gaul and contributed to the Latènisation of the region, a process that proceeded without rupture over a still largely indigenous material culture.

Kruta has connected these mobile Volcan elements, newly established in southern Gaul, with the bands that appear from the mid-3rd century BC as mercenaries in Cisalpine Italy under the name Gaesatae.
