= Brogitarus =

King of Galatia (58–50 BC)

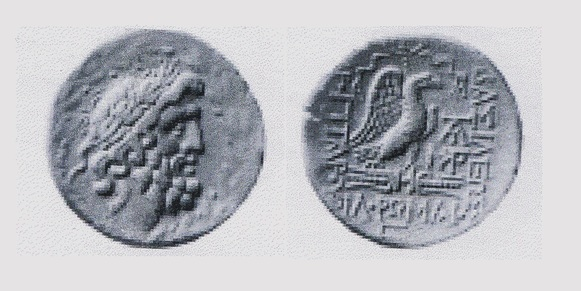
Coin bearing visage of Brogitarus

Brogitarus (/brəˈdʒɪtərəs/ brə-JIT-ər-əs, Classical Latin: [brɔˈɡɪtarʊs]) was king of Galatia in Asia Minor between 63 BC and 50 BC, reigning concurrently with his father-in-law Deiotarus Philoromaeus, who was also tetrarch of the Tolistobogii. By Deiotarus' daughter Adobogiona, Brogitarus was the father of Amyntas, tetrarch of the Trocmi and king of Galatia.

Cicero claims that Brogitarus obtained his elevation to the kingship of Galatia alongside Deiotarus by bribing P. Clodius Pulcher, who was then tribune of the plebs at Rome. Brogitarus also became high priest of the Great Mother at Pessinus after the incumbent was removed through a law introduced by Clodius Pulcher. Cicero impugns not only this procedure but also Brogitarus' character, claiming that the priesthood "was sold for a large sum to Brogitarus, a profligate man, and unworthy of any such sacred character, especially as he had desired it not for the purpose of doing honour to the goddess, but only of profaning her temple." Deiotarus subsequently intervened to remove Brogitarus as high priest on the grounds that the latter had "polluted" its sacred ceremonies.

The name 'Brogitarus' may be understood as brogi-taros 'border-crosser' or (less likely) brogi-taruos 'border-bull'.
