= Tolosates =

Gallic tribe of southern Gaul

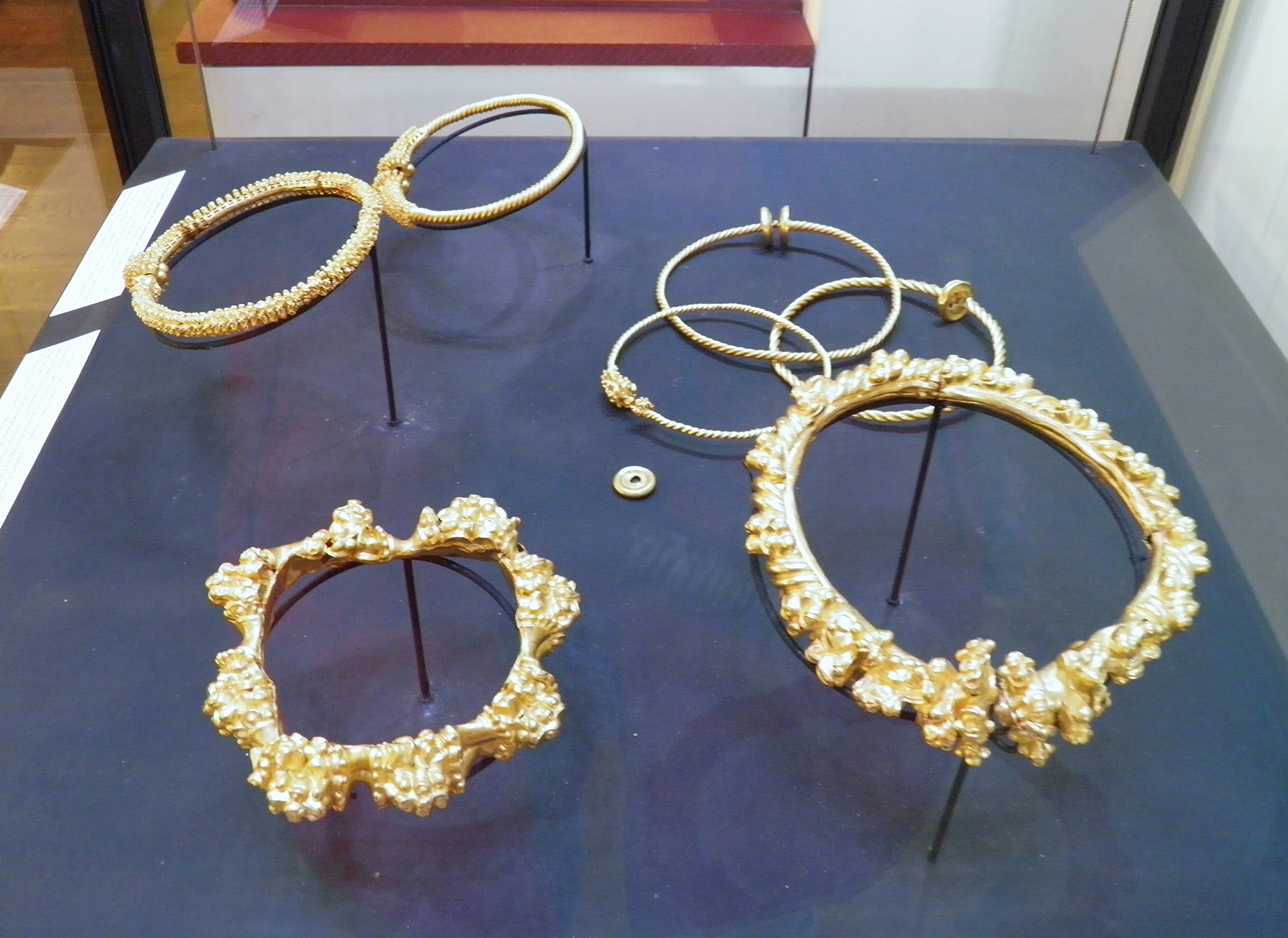
Gallic torcs from the 3rd century BC. Musée Saint-Raymond

The Tolosates were a Gallic tribe dwelling around present-day Toulouse, on the upper Garonne, during the Iron Age and the Roman period. They formed part of the Volcae Tectosages. Allied with Rome and included in the province of Gallia Transalpina by the late 2nd century BC, they defected in 106–105 BC and were subdued by Quintus Servilius Caepio, whose seizure of the sacred gold of Tolosa led to an abundant ancient tradition. Organised as a separate civitas before 56 BC, the Tolosates received Latin rights between Caesar and Augustus. Around 10 BC, their indigenous centre at Vieille-Toulouse was abandoned in favour of the Roman-era town of Tolosa founded on the site of present-day Toulouse.

== Name ==
=== Attestations ===
They are mentioned as Tolosatium by Caesar (1st c. BC), and as Tolosates by Isidore of Seville (7th c. AD). After the grant of Latin rights, the ethnonym was latinised, Tolosani (Pliny, 1st c. AD) replacing Tolosates.

The town itself appears as Tolosa in Caesar, Cicero (Tolosam), Strabo (Τολώσσῃ), Pomponius Mela (Tolosa Tectosagum), Pliny (Tolosani Tectosagum), Ptolemy (Τολῶσα κολωνία), and Cassius Dio (Τόλοσσα), as well as in the Antonine Itinerary and the Itinerarium Burdigalense. The earliest known mention of the name, the Greek Tolóssa (Τολώσσα) of Posidonius, dates to the 90s BC and is preserved in Strabo's excursus on the gold of the Tectosages.

=== Etymology ===
The ethnonym Tolosates is derived from the name of the town, Tolosa (modern Toulouse). Alexander Falileyev regards it as a "possibly but not necessarily Celtic" derivation in -ati, though Pierre-Yves Milcent notes that its suffix -ates is also found in names of peoples that are mostly Aquitanian. The name of the Tectosages, the confederation to which the Tolosates belonged, is by contrast a transparent Celtic formation, translated as 'those who seek possessions' or 'those who seek a dwelling'.

The toponym Tolosa is probably of non-Celtic origin. The closest parallels are found on the southern side of the Pyrenees, with the ancient place names Tolous (near modern Monzón) and Labitolosa (La Puebla de Castro, Huesca), along with several modern Iberian toponyms of the form Tolosa. On this basis, Moret argues that the name is likely older than the establishment of the Volcae Tectosages in the region, and regards it as a pre-Celtic form akin to the non-Indo-European languages of the Iberian Peninsula. On this view, Tolosa was the only capital of a Gallic people to bear a non-Celtic name.

== Geography ==
=== Territory ===
The Tolosates dwelt at the western extremity of Gallia Transalpina, in the middle Garonne valley. The limits of their territory are essentially known through those of the Roman civitas of Tolosa. Two road stations named Fines ('boundaries') appear on the Peutinger Table: one on the road to Carcassonne, located near Ricaud; the other, unlocated, in the area of Bressols and Saint-Nauphary. To the north-west, the Tarn marked the boundary with the Nitiobroges, and to the south lived the Consoranni of the Pyrenean piedmont.

=== Settlements ===
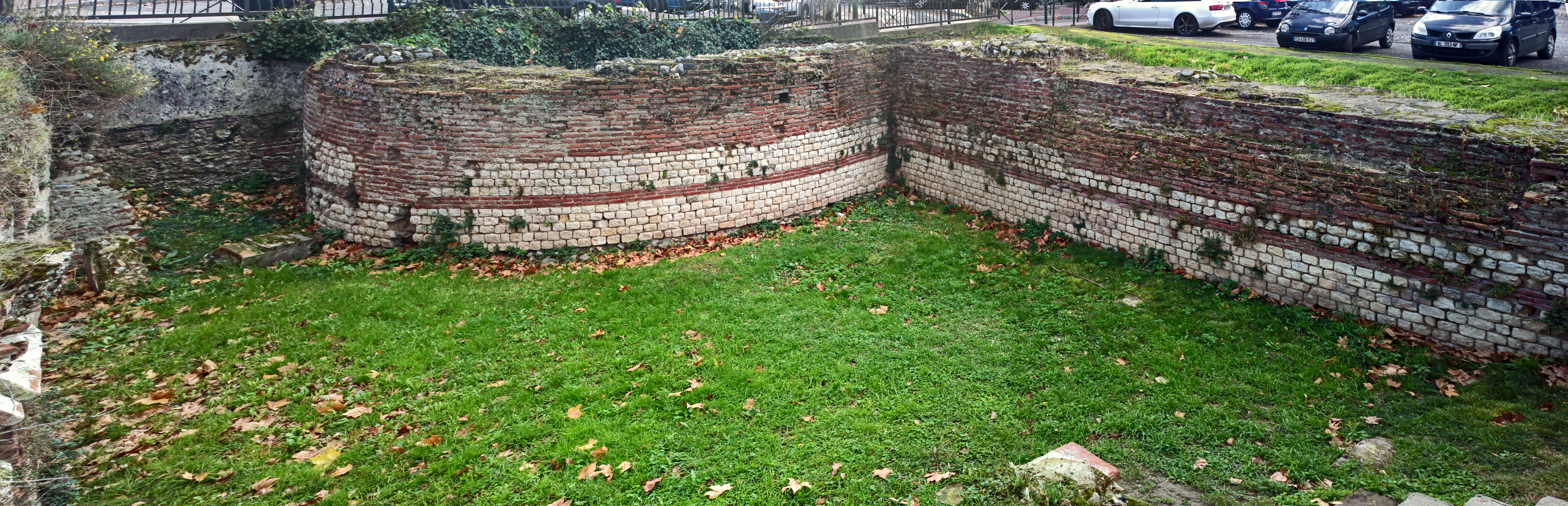
Gallo-Roman enclosure, Place Saint-Jacques

From around 175 BC, a major settlement complex emerged near the confluence of the Garonne and the Ariège rivers. It comprised two poles: an open agglomeration in the present Saint-Roch district, on the low terrace of the Garonne, and an hilltop settlement at Vieille-Toulouse, overlooking the confluence. Covering 90–100 ha, Vieille-Toulouse was one of the most extensive agglomerations of southern Gaul: it developed from 175–150 BC, received a regular street grid by around 125 BC at the latest, and included a sanctuary at La Planho as well as a secondary defensive ditch that went out of use by the end of the 2nd century BC. Its rise was linked to its position on the isthmus route connecting the Mediterranean to Aquitania and the Atlantic, by way of the Aude and the Garonne.

The location of pre-Roman Tolosa has been disputed since the 16th century. Recent excavations have ruled out the centre of modern Toulouse, where no pre-Augustan occupation has been found, as well as Saint-Roch, abandoned by 80–70 BC, leading Philippe Gardes to identify Vieille-Toulouse with the Tolosa of the ancient sources. Vieille-Toulouse was profoundly transformed in the years 50–40 BC, when brick architecture, Italic-style houses and new public buildings appeared, before being abandoned around 10 BC. Thereafter, the Roman-era town of Tolosa was founded in the plain, on the road from Narbonne, its first structured occupation dating to the first decade AD.

== History ==
=== Early history ===
Possible routes of migrations of the Tectosages

The Tolosates were part of the Volcae Tectosages. Drawing on Posidonius, Strabo held that the eastern Tectosages of Galatia had come from the homonymous Volcae Tectosages around Tolosa, and stressed the identity of the two. However, this account is rejected by modern scholarship, which regards the descent of the Galatian tribe from a homonymous people from Gauls as improbable. Venceslas Kruta and Karl Strobel place instead the formation of the Volcae in central Europe and treat the bands that reached Gaul, the Danube and Anatolia as offshoots of that nucleus.

A related tradition held that the gold later seized at Tolosa derived from the plunder of Delphi, carried home by the Tectosages. This booty, laid under a curse, was known as the Gold of Tolosa (aurum Tolosanum). The version, going back to Timagenes, was rejected already in antiquity by Posidonius, who held the Tolosan treasure to be of local origin: the sanctuary at Delphi, despoiled earlier by the Phocians, had held no such riches.

Tolosa, which housed a renowned sanctuary, served as a decision-making and religious centre for the confederation. According to Posidonius, the gold and silver offerings of Tolosa were deposited in two complementary sacred spaces: enclosures (sēkoi) within a built sanctuary inside the town, and sacred ponds (limnai) outside it. Moret interprets this sanctuary as a federal sanctuary of the Tectosages, where political and judicial assemblies could meet under divine protection, on the model of the Drunemeton of the Galatian Tectosages, whose sacred wood, like the stagnant waters of Tolosa, was a sacred space left in its natural state.

=== Theft of the Gold of Tolosa ===
Tolosa concluded an alliance with Rome at an undetermined date before the troubles of 108–106 BC, probably at the time of the creation of the province of Gallia Narbonensis in 121 BC. A Roman military detachment was stationed there, probably in response to the migration of the Tigurini towards south-western Gaul in 108–107 BC.

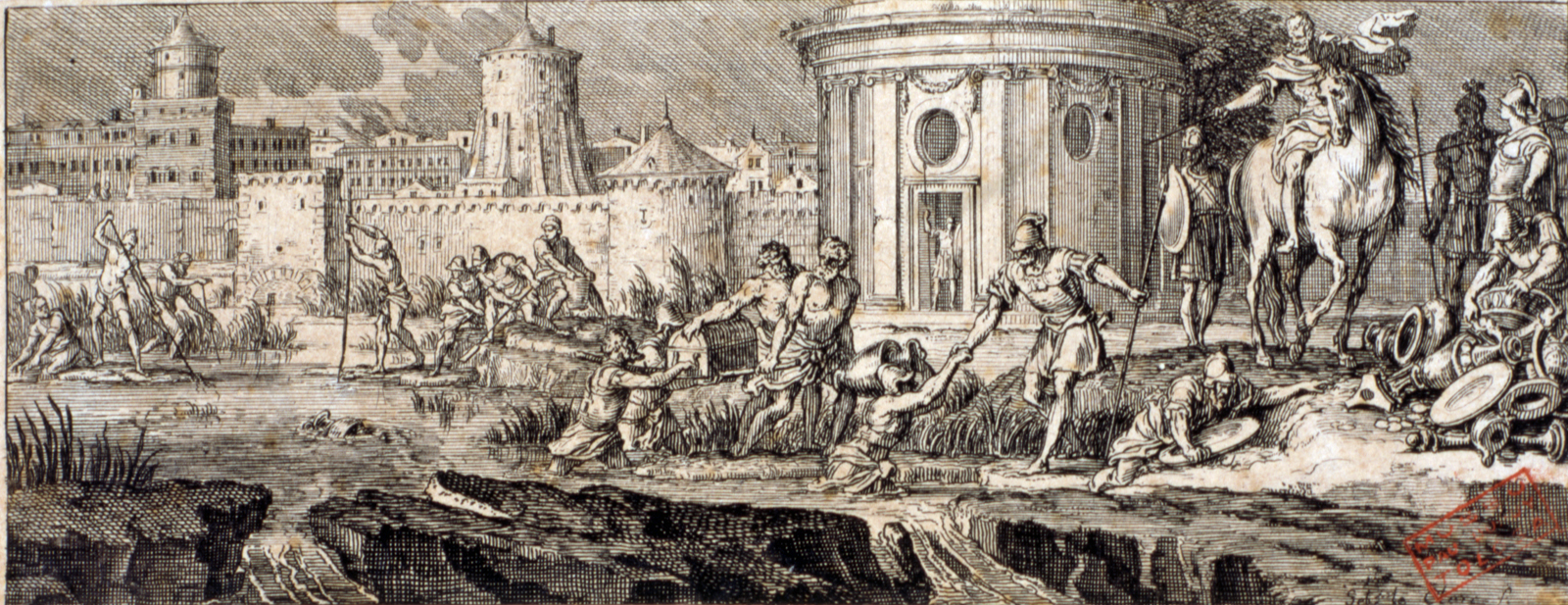
Caepio seizing the Gold of Toulouse, by Sébastien Leclerc after Jean-Pierre Rivalz, ca. 1687

The Tolosates defected in 106 or 105 BC, and the town was retaken and pillaged by Quintus Servilius Caepio. The sacred treasures seized on this occasion, named the Gold of Tolosa (aurum Tolosanum), as well as Caepio's defeat at Arausio the following year, gave rise to an abundant ancient tradition. The ponds around Tolosa, confiscated and probably incorporated into the ager publicus, were divided into lots that the Roman state farmed out to citizens, who dredged them systematically for the bullion sunk in the mud.

The repression that followed entailed the dismantling of the federal organisation of the Tectosages, the decline of the Saint-Roch agglomeration, abandoned around 70 BC, and the corresponding rise of Vieille-Toulouse. The Tectosages thereafter disappear from the sources as a people, suggesting that the confederation was drained of its substance after the events of 106 BC.

=== Roman period ===
A separate civitas of the Tolosates was created through the dismemberment of their territory between Toulouse and Carcassonne at some point before 56 BC, when Caesar mentions Tolosa as part of Gallia Narbonensis.

The loyalty of the Tolosates during the Gallic Wars earned them the grant of Latin rights between Caesar and Augustus. An inscription of 47 BC from Vieille-Toulouse, long the earliest dated Latin inscription known from Gaul, records the construction of a temple, a pedestal and a terrace by a college of twelve members, freemen and slaves of Roman citizens, which Moret takes as a sign of precocious latinisation.

Under Augustus, around 10 BC, the abandonment of Vieille-Toulouse and the foundation of the new Tolosa in the plain made the latter the capital of the civitas of the Tolosates.

== Economy ==
Tolosa functioned in the 2nd and 1st centuries BC as a hub of exchange between the Mediterranean and south-western Gaul. The presence of Iberian traders is documented by inscriptions in the Iberian script painted or incised on amphorae and fine wares, found both at Vieille-Toulouse (175–130 BC) and in the Saint-Roch district, where Iberian, Greek and Latin graffiti of 125–100 BC attest to the cohabitation of several Mediterranean communities. Toulouse was also a major minting centre, striking silver "cross coinage" as well as imitations of Iberian issues. In the early 1st century BC, ties with northern Hispania strengthened further: drawing on the work of Alexis Gorgues, Moret points to a monetary and metrological integration between Tolosa and the Ilergetian region in northeastern Spain, intended to facilitate trade through the central Pyrenean passes rather than along the coastal route.
