= Amyntas of Galatia =

1st-century BC king of Galatia

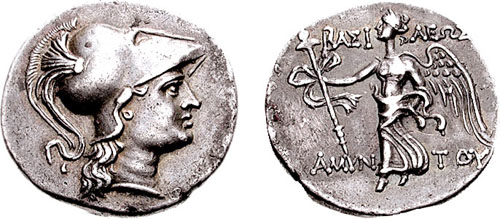
AR tetradrachm of Galatia. Obv.: Athena with helmet. Rev.: Victory holds sceptre with ribbon, Greek legend BAΣΙΛΕΩΣ AMYNTOY ("King Amyntas"). 30 mm., 15.7 gr.

Amyntas (Ancient Greek: Ἀμύντας), Tetrarch of the Trocmi was a King of Galatia and of several adjacent countries between 36 and 25 BC, mentioned by Strabo as contemporary with himself. He was the son of Brogitarus, king of Galatia, and Adobogiona, daughter of king Deiotarus Philoromaeus.

Amyntas seems to have first possessed Lycaonia, where he maintained more than 300 flocks. To this he added the territory of Derbe by the murder of its prince, Antipater of Derbe, the friend of Cicero, and Isaura and Cappadocia by Roman favour. Originally he had been the king of Cappadocia Deiotarus secretary (γραμματεύς), and was made by Amyntas commander in chief (στρατηγός) of the Galatian auxiliaries sent to help Brutus and Cassius against the Triumvires, but deserted to Mark Anthony just before the battle of Philippi in 42 BC.

After the death of Deiotarus, Amyntas was made king of Cappadocia in 37 as a client ruler of Mark Antony. Plutarch enumerates him among the adherents of Mark Antony at Actium and is mentioned as deserting to Octavian, just before the battle.

While pursuing his schemes of aggrandizement, and endeavoring to reduce the refractory highlanders around him, Amyntas made himself master of Homonada or Hoinona, and slew the prince of that place; but his death was avenged by his widow, and Amyntas fell a victim in 25 to an ambush which she laid for him. On his death Galatia became a Roman province.

Amyntas was the father of Artemidoros of the Trocmi, a Galatian nobleman, who married a princess of the Tectosagi, the daughter of Amyntas, Tetrarch of the Tectosagii. They were the parents of Gaius Julius Severus, a nobleman from Acmonia in Galatia, who was in turn the father of Gaius Julius Bassus, proconsul of Bithynia in 98, and Gaius Julius Severus, a Tribune of the Legio VI Ferrata.
