= Tavium =

Ancient settlement in Yozgat, Turkey

Coordinates: 39.859132°N 34.506459°E

- Location within Turkey
- Type: Settlement
- Periods: Iron Age, Roman Republican to High Medieval
- Location: Yozgat District, Yozgat Province, Turkey
- Part of: Galatia

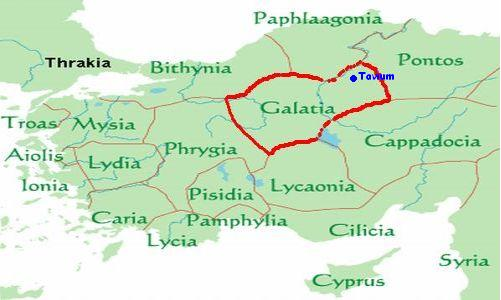
Location of Tavium in Asia Minor.

Tavium, or Tavia (Ancient Greek: Τάουιον, romanized: Taouion and Ancient Greek: Τάβεια, romanized: Taveia and Tavia; Latin: Taouion or Tavium), was the chief city of the Galatian tribe of Trocmi, one of the three Celtic tribes which migrated from the Danube Valley to Galatia in present-day central Turkey in the 3rd century BCE. Owing to its position on the high roads of commerce, Tavium was an important trading post. The site was successively occupied by Hittites, Cimmerians, Persians, Celts, Greeks, Romans, Seljuk Turks and Ottoman Turks. At the time of the Roman Empire, Tavium was an important crossroads and a stopping place on the caravan routes.

Strabo writes that it was a walled garrison and the region's main emporion, which was known for its colossal bronze statue of Zeus and Zeus's sacred sanctuary that served as a place of refuge.

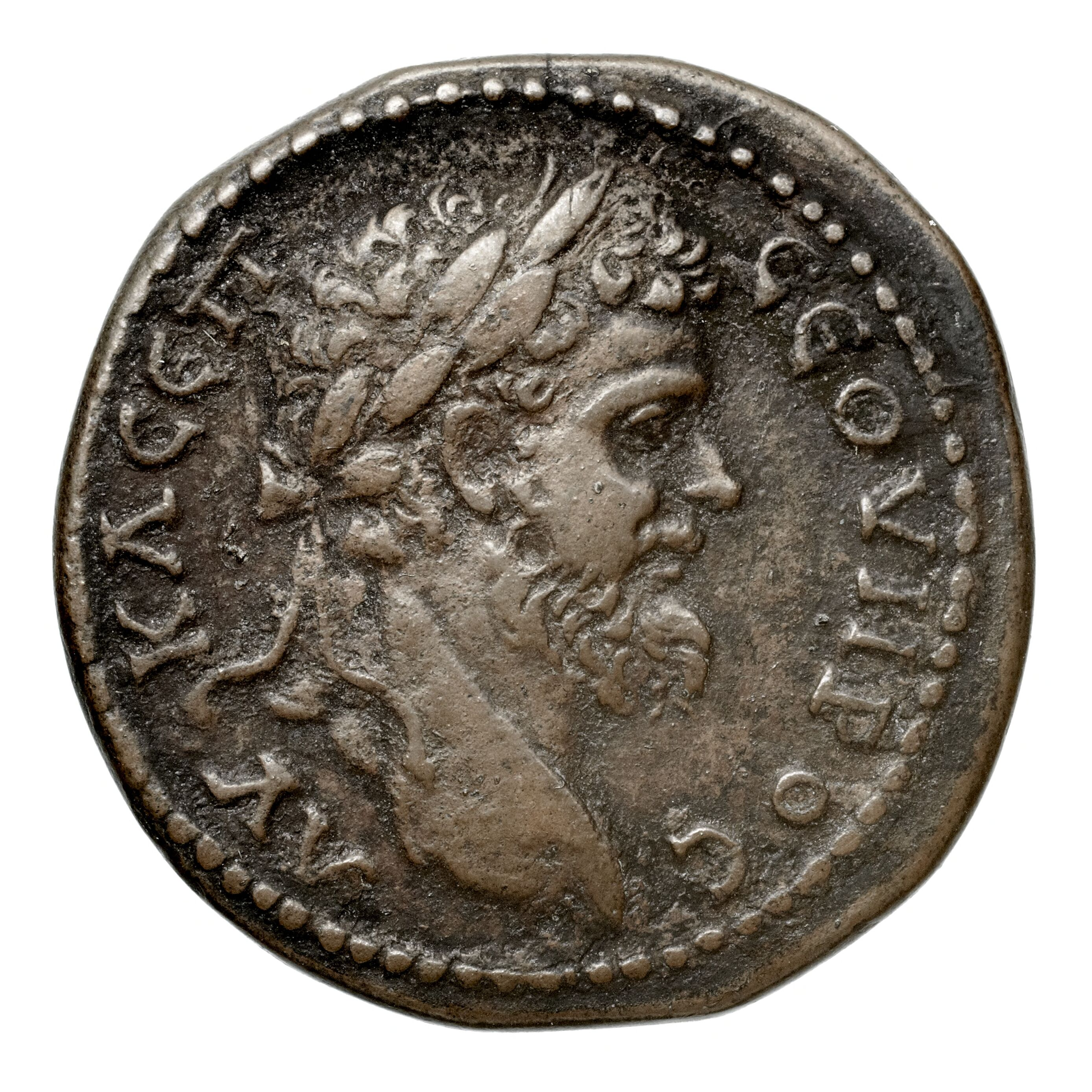
Coin - Bronze, Tavion, Galatia, Septimius Severus.

One of the few things known about Tavium is that there was metalworking; this is known from coins minted there in the early 1st century that bear the likenesses of Marcus Aurelius and Elagabalus. Copper, tin, iron and silver were mined in the nearby mountains. Similar to other Celtic towns of the time, the smelting and stamping was done by a small group of artisans working in one or two stone huts.

Tabia was one of the seven suffragan bishoprics subject to the Metropolis of Ankyra. The other suffragan sees were Helioupolis, Aspone, Berinoupolis, Mnezon, Kine, and Anastasioupolis.

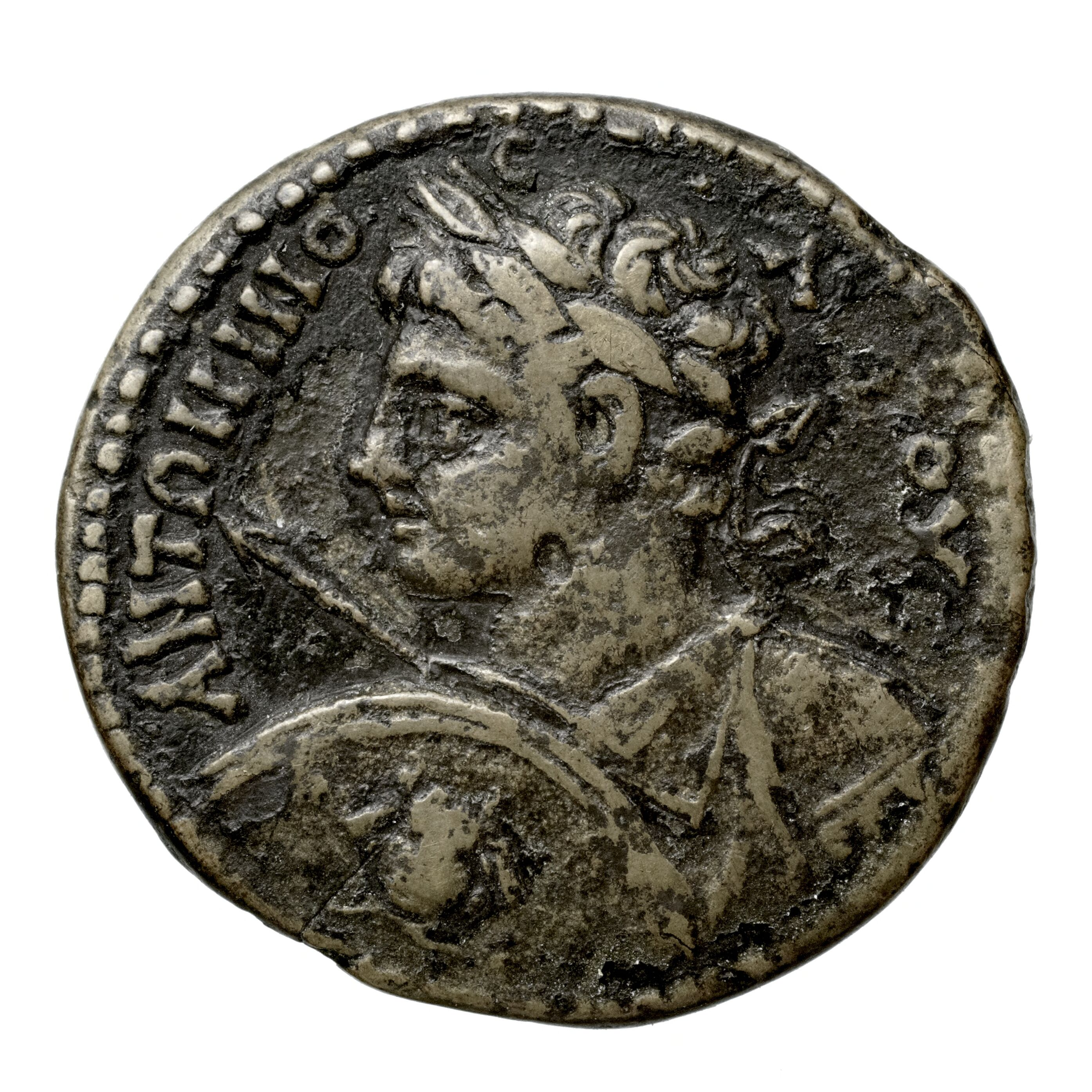
Coinage - Bronze, Tavion, Galatia, Caracalla.

The site of Tavium is generally believed to be ruins situated close to the village of Büyüknefes (previously known as Nefezköy), in a fertile plain east of the Kızılırmak river (ancient Halys) in Yozgat Province. Materials from these ruins were used in building the neighbouring town of Yozgat, which also features the remains of a theatre and, possibly, a temple of Jupiter; these have a number of inscriptions, mostly Byzantine.

Archaeological surveys have been conducted at the site by Karl Strobel and Christoph Gerber since 1997.

In the Notitiæ Episcopatuum the bishopric of Tavium is mentioned up to the 13th century as the first suffragan of Ancyra. The names of five bishops of the area are known: Dicasius, present at the Councils of Neocæsarea and Nice; Julian, at the second Council of Ephesus (449), and at the Council of Chalcedon (451), and a signer of the letter from the Galatian bishops to the Emperor Leo (458); Anastasius, present at the second Council of Constantinople (553); Gregory at the Council in Trullo (692); Philaretus at Constantinople (869).

As of the early 20th century, Büyüknefes was inhabited during the winter by nomadic Turkish tribes. It was then in the kaza (district) of Sungurlu and the vilayet of Ankara. Now it is a part of Yozgat Province.
