= Tectosages =

Ancient Celtic people of Galatia in Asia Minor

The Tectosages (Ancient Greek: Τεκτόσαγες) were one of the three Celtic peoples of Galatia in central Anatolia, together with the Tolistobogii and the Trocmi. They settled in the 3rd century BC in central Galatia around Ancyra (modern Ankara), between the Sangarius and the Halys (modern Kızılırmak). Their tetrarchy was absorbed by Deiotarus in the mid-1st century BC, and after Galatia was annexed by Augustus in 25 BC, Ancyra became one of the principal cities of the Roman province.

== Name ==
The Tectosages are named by Strabo and Livy as one of the three peoples of Galatia, with the Tolistobogii and the Trocmi.

The ethnonym Tectosagii is a latinized form of Gaulish *Textosagioi (sing. Textosagios), where the voiceless velar fricative ⟨x⟩, unknown in Latin, was replaced with the sound ⟨k⟩. It can be translated as 'those who seek a dwelling', or 'those who seek possessions', from the Celtic stem *texto- ('goods, property, possessions'; cf. Old Irish techt 'possession') attached to sagi- ('who is seeking'). The name can be compared with the Old Irish legal term techtaigidir, meaning 'to seek to establish (or reestablish) legal claim to land'.

== Geography ==
The Tectosages occupied central Galatia, with Ancyra (modern Ankara) as their principal fortification. They held the area adjoining Great Phrygia around the temple-state of Pessinus, their territory extending from the Sangarius to the Halys (modern Kızılırmak), south of the Tolistobogii. Probably in the 2nd or 1st century BC they also extended south into the Proseilemmene, the "added land", which took in parts of Lycaonia and probably of Pisidia. Mount Magaba, east of Ancyra and west of the Halys, lay in their territory. A further group, the Toutobodiaci, is linked with the Tectosages in the ancient sources.

== History ==
=== Settlement ===
Possible routes of migrations of the Tectosages

The Tectosages were the only one of the three Galatian peoples whose name also occurs in the Celtic West. Groups bearing the name are attested in three regions: in Galatia; in the Hercynian Forest north of the upper Danube, where they are mentioned by Caesar; and as the Volcae Tectosages in southern Gaul around Tolosa. On the strength of this shared name Strabo, drawing on Posidonius, derived the people who reached Asia Minor from the Tectosages of Gauls. However, this account is rejected by modern scholarship, which regards the descent of the Galatian tribe from a homonymous people from Gauls as improbable. Venceslas Kruta and Karl Strobel instead place the formation of the Volcae in central Europe and treat the bands that reached Gaul, the Danube and Anatolia as offshoots of that nucleus.

The Tectosages reached Anatolia as part of the migration of Celtic peoples from the middle Danube region into the Balkans and Asia Minor in the early 3rd century BC. After the attacks on Macedonia and Greece between 281 and 278 BC, the Galatians were admitted across the Hellespont through an alliance with Nicomedes I of Bithynia and were settled in north-central Anatolia by the end of the 260s BC. The Tectosages took the central lands around Ancyra. In the division of the Aegean and western Anatolian seaboard among the three peoples for raiding, the Tectosages are said to have obtained the least.

=== Galatian wars and tetrarchy ===
In 189 BC, during the Roman campaign of Gnaeus Manlius Vulso, the Tectosages made their stand on Mount Magaba while the Tolistobogii held Mount Olympus, and both were defeated. Like the other peoples the Tectosages were divided into four sections under tetrarchs, the twelve tetrarchs of Galatia meeting at a place called the Drunemeton. In the mid-1st century BC their tetrarch was Castor Tarcondarius, whose stronghold was Gorbeous, south of Ancyra. The Tectosages supplied 300 horsemen to Pompey at the battle of Pharsalus in 48 BC. Deiotarus of the Tolistobogii, who already held the Tolistobogii and the Trocmi, absorbed the Tectosages as well by putting Castor Tarcondarius and his wife, Deiotarus' own daughter, to death at Gorbeous, probably after 43 BC.

=== Roman province ===
The last Galatian king, Amyntas, was killed in about 25 BC, and in that year Galatia was annexed and made a Roman province. Ancyra became one of the three centres of the province and of its koinon, alongside Tavium and Pessinus.
