= Deiotarus =

Galatian king

Deiotarus of Galatia (in Galatian and Greek Deiotaros, surnamed Philoromaios ("Friend of the Romans"); c. 105 BC – 42 BC, 41 BC or 40 BC) was a Chief Tetrarch of the Tolistobogii in western Galatia, Asia Minor, and a King of Galatia ("Gallo-Graecia"). He was considered one of the most adept of Celtic kings, ruling the three tribes of Celtic Galatia from his fortress in Blucium.

The name Deiotarus is generally translated as Galatian Celtic "Divine-bull" (*deiuo-tauros; cf. Old Irish dia, Welsh duw, Old Welsh duiu, "God" and Old Irish tarb, Welsh tarw "bull", with Western Celtic metathesis of the cluster -uro- to -ruo-).

== Biography ==
Deiotarus was a faithful ally of the Romans and became involved in the struggles between the Roman generals that led to the fall of the Republic from 44 BC. He changed sides and supported the triumvirs, keeping his kingdom until his death.

He is first heard of at the beginning of the Third Mithridatic War, when he drove the troops of Mithridates VI of Pontus under Eumachus from Phrygia, and he was a witness when Mithridates VI saw his invasion of Phrygia stopped by the Romans, both in 75 BC or 74 BC. His most influential friend was Pompey. When settling the affairs of Asia after Mithridates VI failed in his invasion of Phrygia sometime between 60 BC and 65 BC, Pompey rewarded Deiotarus for his assistance against him with the title of King. Deiotarus increased his territory to include part of eastern Pontus, and the Roman Senate granted him Lesser Armenia and most of Galatia. On the outbreak of the civil war in 49 BC, Deiotarus naturally sided with his old patron and ally Pompey and the Optimates in their fight against Julius Caesar, who was defying the Senate. When Pompey was defeated at the Battle of Pharsalus in 48 BC, he escaped back to Asia-Minor. After Pharsalus Deiotarus faced execution, but was saved by switching sides and later by the advocacy of Cicero. During this time, Pharnaces, the son of Mithridates, had seized Lesser Armenia, and defeated Deiotarus' Galatian legions which were part of Domitius Calvinus' army in the Battle of Nicopolis. Fortunately for Deiotarus, Julius Caesar at that time (47 BC) arrived in Asia from Egypt, and was met by the tetrarch in the dress of a suppliant. Caesar pardoned him for having sided with Pompey, ordered him to resume his royal attire, and hastened against Pharnaces, whom he defeated at Zela.

In consequence of the complaints of certain Galatian princes, Deiotarus was deprived of part of his dominions in 47 BC, but was pardoned by Caesar and allowed to retain the title of King. On the death of Mithridates of Pergamum, Tetrarch of the Trocmi, Deiotarus was a candidate for the vacancy. Other tetrarchs also pressed their claims; and, further, Deiotarus was accused at Rome in 45 BC by his grandson Castor of having attempted to assassinate Caesar when the latter, then Dictator, was his guest in Galatia. Cicero, who entertained a high opinion of Deiotarus, whose acquaintance he had made when governor of Cilicia, undertook his defence, the case being heard in Caesar's own house at Rome. Cicero to Gaius Caesar: "... for it was king Deiotarus who raised your family, when abject and obscure, from darkness into light. Who ever heard of your father, or who he was, before they heard whose son-in-law he was?" The matter was allowed to drop for a time, and the assassination of Caesar prevented any final decision of the verdict being pronounced. In his speech Cicero briefly dismisses the charge of assassination, the main question being the distribution of the provinces, which was the real cause of the quarrels between Deiotarus and his relatives.

After Caesar's death, Mark Antony, for a large monetary consideration, publicly announced that, in accordance with instructions left by Caesar, Deiotarus was to resume possession of all the territory of which he had been deprived. When civil war again broke out, Deiotarus was persuaded to support the anti-Caesarian party of Brutus and Cassius, but after the Battle of Philippi in 42 BC, went over to the triumvirs. He remained in possession of his kingdom until his death at a very advanced age.

Deiotarus was the patron to whom the Greek agricultural manual by Diophanes of Nicaea was dedicated.

He was married to Berenice, Princess of Pergamon, daughter of Attalus III Philomater Euergetes, King of Pergamon, and his wife of the Attalid dynasty. They were the parents of Adobogiona, who married Brogitarus, King of Galatia, who reigned concurrently with his father-in-law. Adobogiona and Brogitarus were the parents of Amyntas, Tetrarch of the Trocmi and King of Galatia.

== Legacy ==
The Legio XXII Deiotariana, a Roman legion, traced its lineage back to Deiotarus. It was originally part of the Galatian Army, and the equivalent of three legions. After suffering a defeat it was consolidated into a single legion, and functioned as an informal Roman legion under Julius Caesar until Deiotarus' death, at which point it was incorporated into the Roman Army with its former king as its namesake.

== See also ==
- Adobogiona
