= Trocmi =

Ancient Celtic people of Galatia in Asia Minor

The Trocmi (Ancient Greek: Τρόκμοι, Trókmoi) were one of the three Celtic peoples of Galatia in central Anatolia, together with the Tolistobogii and the Tectosages. The easternmost of the three, they settled in the 3rd century BC in the country east of the Halys (modern Kızılırmak) adjoining Pontus and Cappadocia, with their centre at Tavium. In the mid-1st century BC their tetrarch Brogitarus was made a king through Rome, and on his death the Trocmian tetrarchy passed to Deiotarus of the Tolistobogii. After Galatia was annexed by Augustus in 25 BC, Tavium became the autonomous city of the people, whose community styled itself the Sebastēnoi Trokmoi Tavianoi.

== Name ==
They are mentioned as Trokmoi (Τρόκμοι) by Strabo and other Greek authors, as Trogmi by Livy and Pliny, and as Trocmi by Cicero.

The name Trocmi, which is probably Celtic, has an unclear etymology. A connection with Old Irish tróg ('miserable') has been suggested, though it remains uncertain.

== Geography ==
The Trocmi were the easternmost of the three Galatian peoples and the eastern neighbours of the Tectosages. Their territory lay along the right bank of the middle Halys (modern Kızılırmak), in the part of Galatia bordering the kingdom of Pontus and Cappadocia. The Halys formed their western border, and a notice in Pliny may indicate that at some period they also held ground north-west of the river in Paphlagonia. Their eastern frontier probably lay east of modern Yozgat, though how far is unclear.

Their principal settlement was Tavium, and the sources also name Posdala among their towns. Tavium lay east of the Halys and had been a place of worship since the Hittite period, when it was known as Tawinija. The sanctuary later became one of Zeus Tavianos and gained international standing in Hellenistic times. In the course of the Galatian settlement of central Anatolia it became the tribal centre of the Trocmi.

== History ==
=== Origins and migration ===
The Trocmi reached Anatolia as the final stage of the migration of Celtic peoples from the middle Danube region into the Balkans and Asia Minor in the early 3rd century BC. After the Celtic attacks on Macedonia and Greece between 281 and 278 BC, the warrior groups were admitted across the Hellespont through an alliance with Nicomedes I of Bithynia, who secured them as allies against the Seleucids, and were permitted to occupy land in the direction of Ancyra. An ancient tradition, reported by Strabo on the authority of Posidonius, derived the Galatians from the Gaulish Tectosages, but this account is rejected by modern scholarship, and the supposed descent of the Trocmi from a homonymous Gaulish people is regarded as improbable.

The various Galatian groups were established in their newly acquired territories by the end of the 260s BC. The Trocmi took the easternmost lands, east of the Halys. The resident population was neither exterminated nor driven out and probably formed the majority of the inhabitants of the new polity.

=== Tetrarchy and the late Republic ===
Each of the three peoples was divided into four sections, every section under a tetrarch, and the twelve tetrarchs of Galatia formed a council that met at a place called the Drunemeton. In the mid-1st century BC the tetrarch of the Trocmi was Brogitarus, who was married to Adobogiona, a daughter of Deiotarus of the Tolistobogii. His own father had also borne the name Deiotarus, apparently as a member of a Trocmian branch of the same family. In the settlement of the East by Pompey in 63 BC, Brogitarus received Mithridatium, a fortress in Pontus, together with land in Armenia Minor, and about 58 BC Clodius had the title of king conferred on him at Rome along with control of Pessinus. (Note: Venceslas Kruta makes Brogitarus a son of Deiotarus and assigns the royal title to Pompey's settlement of 63 BC. The fuller account followed here, in which Brogitarus is the son-in-law of Deiotarus and owes the royal title to Clodius in 58 BC, is that of Stephen Mitchell.)

Brogitarus died in the late 50s BC, and the Trocmian tetrarchy passed to Deiotarus, who thereby brought all three Galatian tetrarchies under his control. It was briefly recovered about 47 to 45 BC by Brogitarus' nephew, Mithridates of Pergamon, before reverting to Deiotarus.

=== Roman province ===
The last Galatian king, Amyntas, was killed in about 25 BC, and in that year his possessions were annexed and Galatia was made a Roman province. Under the Galatian tetrarchs Tavium had remained a fortified place rather than a city, described by Strabo as a phrourion. Only in Augustan times did it become an autonomous polis, one of the three centres of the provincial koinon alongside Ancyra and Pessinus. On its coins of the 1st and 2nd centuries AD the community styled itself the Sebastēnoi Trokmoi Tavianoi, and an inscription of the early 3rd century gives Sebastē Trokmōn Taouia.

== Material culture ==
Most of what is known of Galatian society, religion and material culture concerns the three peoples together rather than the Trocmi in particular. In Trocmian territory a late Hellenistic cemetery at Boğazköy has yielded extended inhumations in stone cist graves and burials of children in jars, most of them without grave goods. The finds include a La Tène type fibula and, in one grave, an iron sword with its scabbard and a spearhead. A class of pottery once called "Galatian ware", found in Trocmian territory and dated to the 2nd century BC, may in fact be a local ceramic tradition owing little or nothing to La Tène Europe.
