= Tolistobogii =

Ancient Celtic people of Galatia in Asia Minor

The Tolistobogii or Tolistoagii (Ancient Greek: Τολιστοβώγιοι; also Tolistobogioi) were one of the three Celtic peoples of Galatia in central Anatolia, together with the Tectosages and the Trocmi. The westernmost of the three, they settled in the 3rd century BC in northern and western Galatia, between the Sangarius and Phrygia Epictetus, with the temple-state of Pessinus on their borders. In 189 BC, led by Ortiagon, they were defeated by a Roman army under Gnaeus Manlius Vulso on Mount Olympus, and in the 1st century BC their tetrarch Deiotarus became king of Galatia and brought all three Galatian peoples under his rule.

== Name ==
Their name appears in two forms. The more common, Tolistobogioi (Greek Τολιστοβώγιοι, Latin Tolistobogii, also Tolostobogii), is used by Strabo and Livy, among others. The variant Tolistoagioi (Τολιστοάγιοι) appears chiefly in inscriptions, while both forms occur as variant readings in Polybius. The two are generally taken to denote the same people.

The tribal name is a compound whose second element is generally regarded as Celtic, possibly bogio- ('breakers') in the form Tolistobogioi, or agio- ('fighters') in the variant Tolistoagioi. The first element, tolisto-, has no accepted etymology. It has been compared with Old Irish tol ('will, desire'), but its analysis is difficult, and Alexander Falileyev observes that it may not be Celtic at all. Ludwig Rübekeil tentatively derives the name from a Celtic root *tel-, a rare archaic superlative formation, and translates it as 'the most enduring' or 'hardest'.

== Geography ==
The Tolistobogii were the westernmost of the three Galatian peoples and the north-western neighbours of the Tectosages. They occupied northern and western Galatia: north of Pessinus their territory stretched west across the Sangarius, on either side of the Tembris river (the modern Porsuk), as far as Phrygia Epictetus, and to the north it extended towards Bithynia and Paphlagonia. Their southern lands probably included or bordered the Çile Dağı, identified with the ancient Mount Olympus, where they were defeated by the Romans in 189 BC. The temple-state of Pessinus, the great sanctuary of the mother goddess, was their chief market and lay on their western edge.

Three of their tetrarchies are known by name, the Ambitouti, the Tosiopes and the Voturi. Their strongholds included Blucium, the residence of the tetrarch Deiotarus, and Peium, where he kept his treasury.

== History ==
The Tolistobogii reached Anatolia as part of the migration of Celtic peoples from the middle Danube region into the Balkans and Asia Minor in the early 3rd century BC. After the attacks on Macedonia and Greece between 281 and 278 BC, the Galatians were admitted across the Hellespont through an alliance with Nicomedes I of Bithynia and were settled in north-central Anatolia by the end of the 260s BC. The Tolistobogii took the westernmost lands. In the division of the Aegean and western Anatolian seaboard among the three peoples for raiding, Aeolis and Ionia fell to them.

In 189 BC, during the Roman campaign of Gnaeus Manlius Vulso, the Tolistobogii, led by Ortiagon and joined by the fighting men of the Trocmi, gathered their whole people on Mount Olympus, which they fortified with ditches and ramparts. The position was stormed and the Galatians were overwhelmed, with heavy losses and as many as 40,000 taken captive, while the Tectosages and the rest of the Trocmi were defeated in turn on Mount Magaba. After the disaster Ortiagon for a time made himself sole ruler of the region, but he was defeated by Eumenes II of Pergamon. His wife Chiomara, taken captive during the campaign, became known in the ancient sources for killing the Roman officer who had assaulted her.

In the later 2nd century BC the Tolistobogian chieftain Sinorix was a dominant figure, and his authority passed to his son Deiotarus. Deiotarus, tetrarch of the Tolistobogii, became the leading Galatian ruler of the 1st century BC. Rewarded by Rome for his services with territory and the title of king, he brought the tetrarchies of the Trocmi and the Tectosages under his control and so united all three Galatian peoples. His fortified residence was at Blucium and his treasury at Peium, both in Tolistobogian territory.

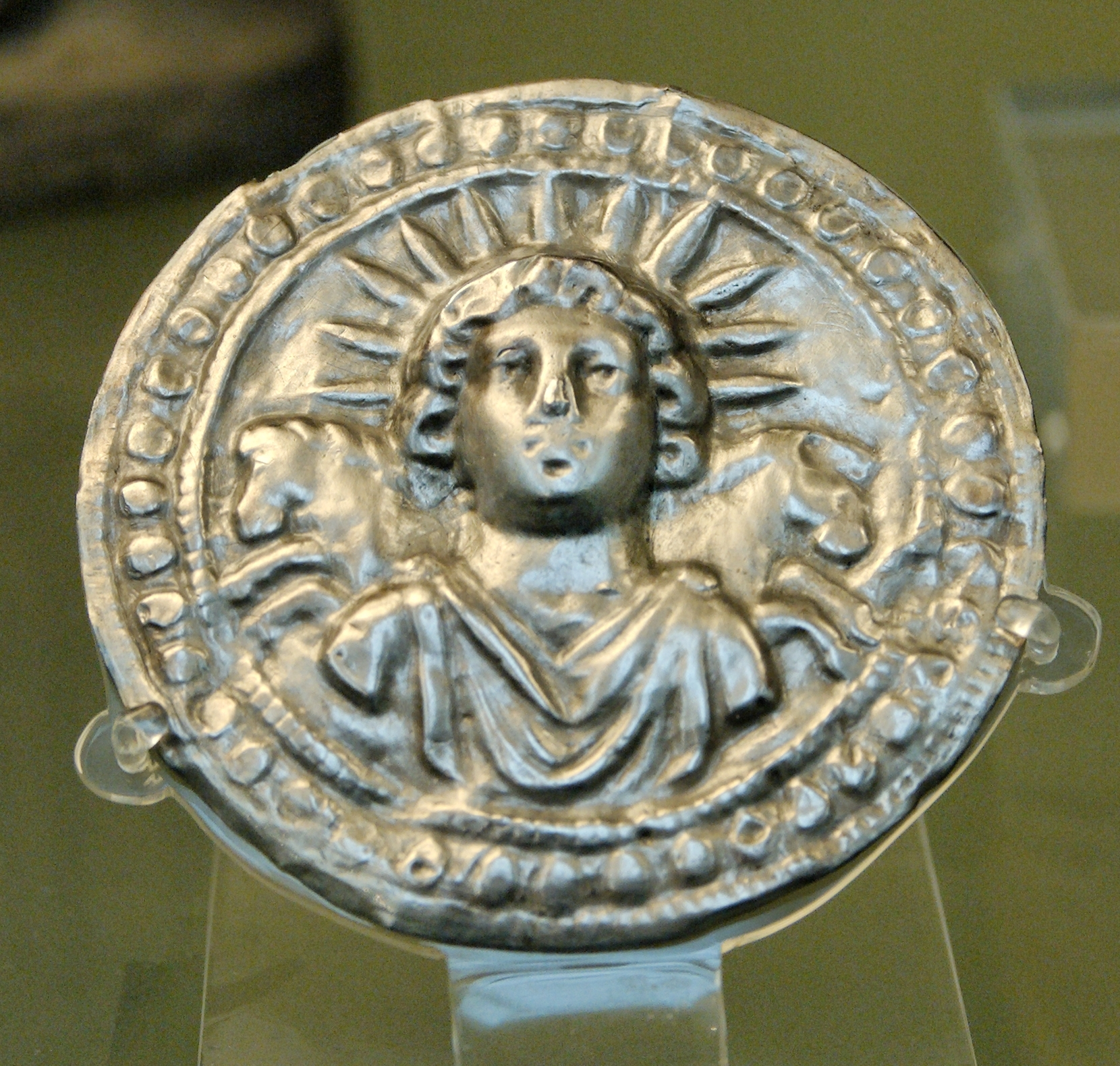
3rd century AD Sol Invictus disk from Pessinus, then capital city of the Tolistobogii.

The last Galatian king, Amyntas, was killed in about 25 BC, and in that year Galatia was annexed and made a Roman province. Pessinus became one of the three centres of the province and of its koinon, alongside Ancyra and Tavium.

== Burials and material culture ==
The most impressive Galatian remains lie in Tolistobogian territory. The ruling family was buried in stone chambered tombs beneath earthen tumuli, of a type also found in Bithynia and Pontus, the finest examples of which cluster at Karalar. An inscription identifies one of the Karalar tombs as the burial of Deiotarus the Younger, the son and co-regent of Deiotarus, who died between 43 and 41 BC. The distribution of these tombs is confined to the north-western and western part of Galatia, the territory of the Tolistobogii, which may reflect the extra-regional contacts of the ruling lineage. The same area holds the fortified elite residences of the Galatian period, among them Blucium and Peium.
