= Galatian War =

War between the Galatian Gauls and the Roman Republic fought in 189 BC

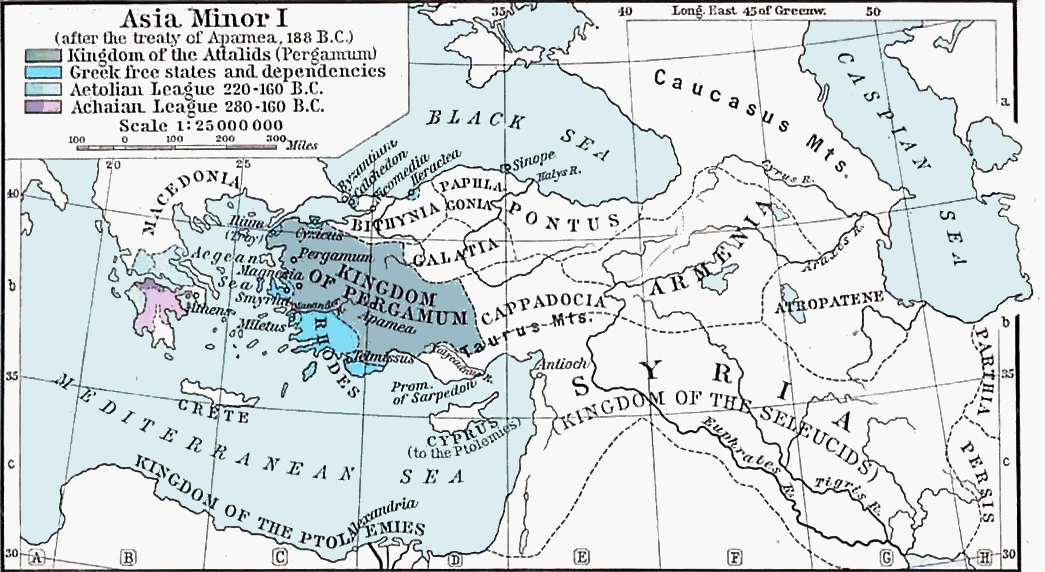
- A map showing the location of Galatia.
Date	189 BC
Location	Galatia, Asia Minor (present-day Turkey)
Result	Roman-Pergamene victory

Belligerents
Galatians; Tolistobogii; Tectosagi; Trocmi	Roman Republic; Pergamum

Commanders and leaders
Eposognatus; Orgiagon; Chiomara; Komboiomaros; Gaulotos	Gnaeus Manlius Vulso; Attalus II

Strength
Over 50,000 men (overstated)	30,000–35,000 Roman and allied forces 2,800 Pergamese troops

Casualties and losses
40,000 dead or captured at Mount Olympus (overstated); 8,000 dead at Ancyra; Tolistobogii and Tectosagi massacred	Unknown

The Galatian War was a war fought in 189 BC between the Galatian Gauls and the Roman Republic, supported by their ally Pergamum. The war was fought in Galatia in central Asia Minor, in present-day Turkey. The Romans had just defeated the Seleucids in the Roman–Seleucid War and were in the midst of concluding a treaty with the latter.

The Romans had then turned their attention towards the Gallic tribes of Galatia who were known for making frequent raids into other cities in Asia Minor and possessing much loot. Ancient historians noted that Gnaeus Manlius Vulso, the consul, had justified the invasion by saying that it was in retaliation for the Galatians supplying troops to the Seleucids during the war, and that Vulso had embarked on this campaign without the permission of the Roman Senate. However, modern historians argue that the war had either the covert or tacit approval of the Senate.

Joined by troops from Pergamum, the Romans marched inland, avoiding cities held by the Seleucids and attacking those which had not formally allied with the latter. Modern historians argue that this measure was taken to preserve the Roman–Seleucid truce while also weakening potential Seleucid allies. The Roman army then marched south, possibly to receive supplies from Roman ships at the port of Attalia (modern day Antalya). They then marched northward and unsuccessfully attempted to negotiate with the Galatians. The Romans defeated the Galatians in the battle of Mount Olympus, thought to be either Çile Dağı, a hill located between Gordion and Ancyra, or Alis Daği in northern Galatia, on the border with Bithynia. The Romans then defeated a larger Galatian contingent on a hill near Ancyra (modern day Ankara in Turkey).

These defeats forced the Galatians to sue for peace and the Romans returned to the coast of Asia Minor, where Vulso concluded the Treaty of Apamea with the Seleucids. The territories through which the Roman army had marched during this campaign were transferred from the Seleucids to either Rome or its allies, which modern historians argue was one of the purposes of the campaign. When Vulso returned to Rome, he was charged with threatening the peace between the Seleucids and Rome. He was cleared and was granted a triumph by the Senate. As a result of the campaign, Greco-Asian religious rituals and luxury began to be introduced to Rome, which ancient historians blamed for the moral decline of the Roman Republic. The loot brought by Vulso was used to repay Roman taxpayers and also for increased expenditure on infrastructure.

== Background ==
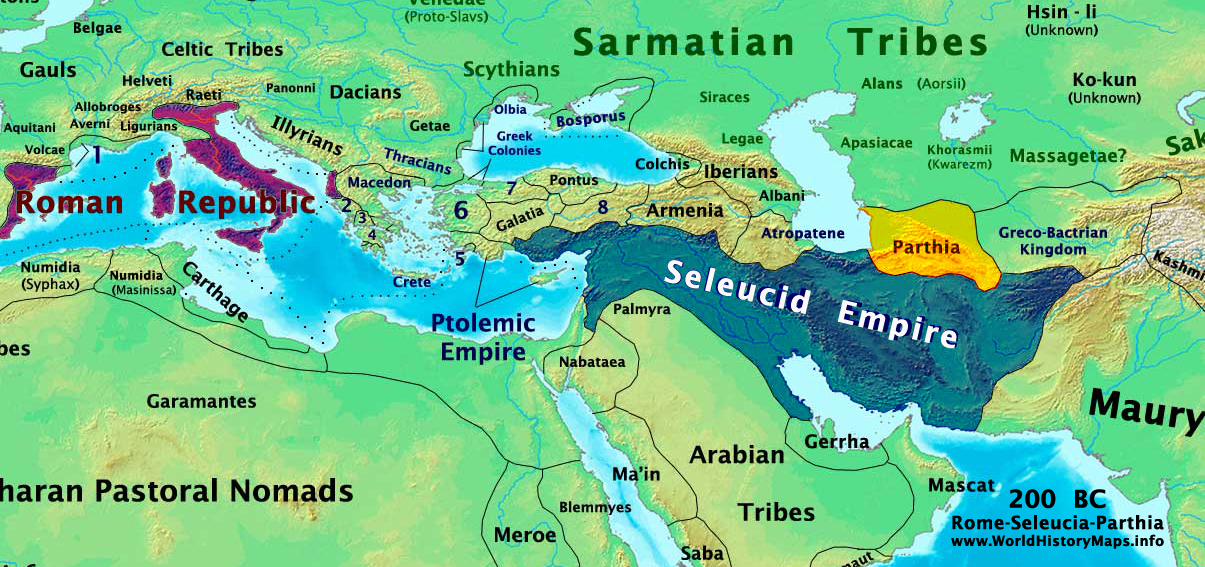
The Roman Republic, Galatia and the Seleucid Empire in 200 BC.

In 191 BC, Antiochus the Great, the Emperor of the Seleucid Empire, had invaded Greece. The Romans intervened, defeating him at the Battle of Thermopylae and forcing the Seleucid army to retreat to Asia Minor. The Romans pursued Antiochus and the Seleucids across the Aegean Sea; and together with their ally, King Eumenes II of Pergamum, decisively defeated the Seleucid army at the Battle of Magnesia in 190 or 189 BC. Antiochus sued for peace and began settling it with Scipio Asiaticus, the Roman consul.

Gnaeus Manlius Vulso, elected a Roman consul for 189 BC and deployed to Asia, arrived at Ephesus during the spring season. Vulso assumed command of Scipio's army, which was now idle since the Seleucids had been defeated. He was sent to conclude the treaty Scipio was arranging and ensure Antiochus accepted the terms set by the Romans. However, he was not content with the task given to him and started to plan for a new war. He addressed the soldiers, congratulated them on their victory and then proposed a new war against the Gauls of Galatia in Asia Minor. The pretext he used for the invasion was that the Galatians had supplied soldiers to the Seleucid army at the Battle of Magnesia. Historians have cited the ancient Roman historian Livy to argue that the principal reason for the invasion was Vulso's desire to seize the wealth of the Galatians, who had become rich from plundering their neighbors, and to gain glory for himself.

A proposal had been introduced in the Roman Senate to reduce the size of Vulso's army, but it did not pass. Three modern historians have thus argued that the Senate was aware of the likelihood of a war with the Galatians, and that it had allowed the continued deployment of the army either to counterbalance the Seleucids or fill the power vacuum created by their defeat. The historian Esther V. Hansen argues that the Senate had heard representations against the Galatians from both the king of Pergamum and the Greek cities in Asia Minor, and that it had kept the army deployed in Asia Minor in order to deal with the Galatians. For the size of this army, the historian John D. Grainger arrives at a possible range of 30 to 35 thousand total soldiers, including those fielded by the allies. (Note: There were "3,000 auxiliaries contributed by the Achaean League and king Eumenes, 800 Pergamene cavalry, 500 Tralli and Cretans, and 2,000 Macedonian and Thracian volunteers" in Scipio's army before the Battle of Magnesia. Grainger says there could have been ~5,000 allied soldiers in Vulso's army before the start of the campaign.)

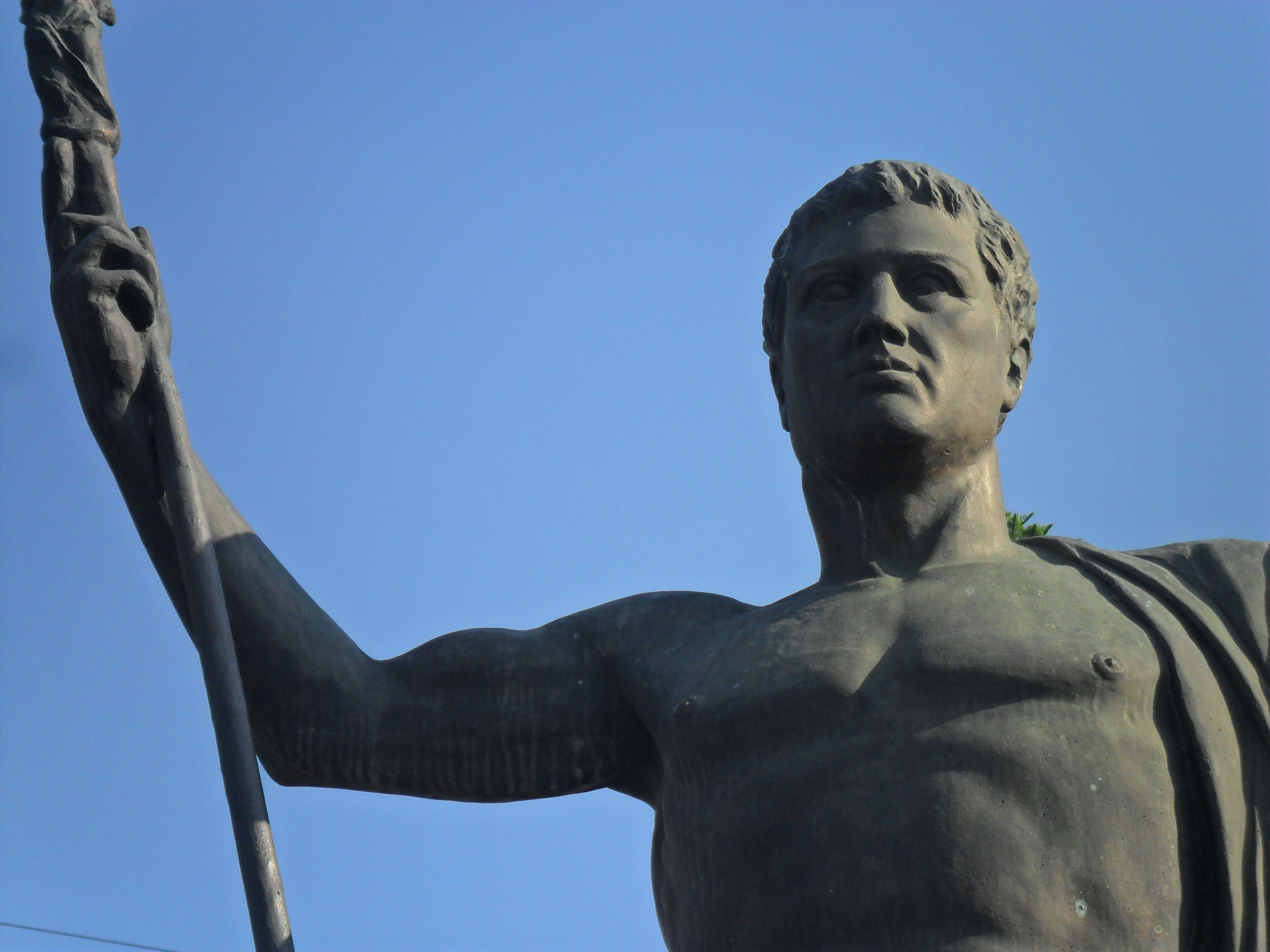
A statue of Attalus II in modern day Turkey.

This was the first war started by a Roman general without the permission of the Senate or the people. Vulso started his preparations for the war by summoning the Pergamese to help. Since the King of Pergamum, Eumenes II, was in Rome at the time, his brother and regent Attalus II took command of the Pergamese army. He joined the Roman army a few days later with 1,000 infantry and 500 cavalry.

== March inland ==
The combined Roman–Pergamese army started their march from Ephesus. They advanced inland, passing Magnesia on the Maeander and the city of Alabanda where they were met by 1,000 infantry and 300 cavalry led by Attalus's brother, Athenaeus. They then marched to Antiochia where they were met by Antiochus' son, Seleucus, who offered food supplies as part of the treaty that was being concluded. The army then marched through the mountainous regions of Caria, Phrygia and Pisidia. The army passed through or encamped at cities like Gordiu Teichos, Tabae and Eriza. Grainger notes that these cities were relatively poorer than those to the immediate north: Aphrodisias, Heraclea at Latmus, Apollonia and Themisonium; he argues that Vulso chose not to pass through these wealthier cities because they were fortified by the Seleucids and an attack on them could trigger a new war. Grainger further argues that Vulso's primary intent in this campaign was to weaken Seleucid allies, not to loot.

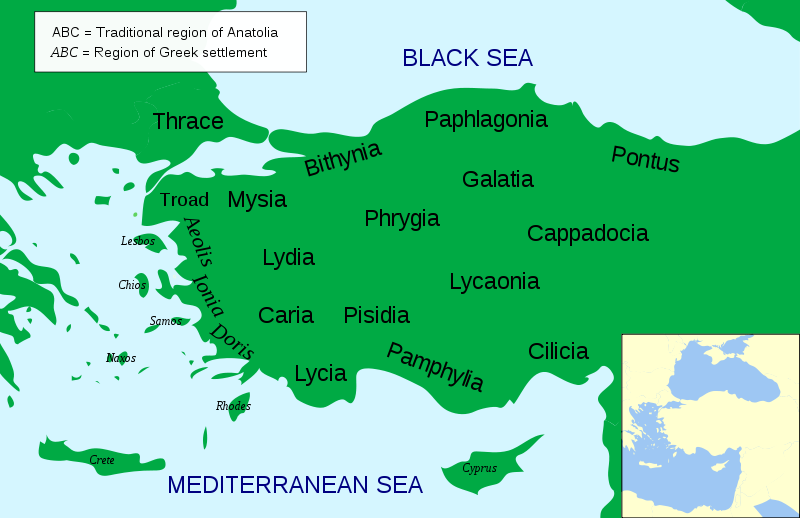
Map of Asia Minor with its regions marked,

The army then advanced into the territory of Cibyra, ruled by Moagetes, who Livy says was a tyrant. Moagetes persuaded Vulso to accept 100 talents of silver as indemnity and promised to provide him with 10,000 medimnoi of wheat. (Note: One medimnos of wheat weighed around 41 kilograms (90 lb).) Vulso then crossed the Caularis river, (Note: Possibly the Çavdir Çay river according to historian David Magie.) Lake Cabalitis (Lake Söğüt) and arrived in Madamprum/Mandropolis. The army plundered Laco/Lagon (Lagbe), then crossed the River Cobulatus/Colobatus (the upper Istanos Çay), where he was met by ambassadors from Sinda, a town in Pisidia. The ambassadors asked for assistance fighting against the city of Termessos, which had taken over all their country except the capital. The consul accepted their request. He entered Termessian territory, allowing the Termessians to enter his alliance for fifty talents and for their withdrawal from Sindian territory.

Vulso marched for two days via Pogla and Andeda to seize the city of Cormasa in Pisidia, and there seized a large booty. The archaeologist George Ewart Bean posited that Cormasa was the modern village of Eğnes near Burdur, while the historian Alan S. Hall posited that it was located east of the Lysis river, which has been triangulated near modern Çeltikçi. Grainger notes that Vulso did not fully enter Pamphylia and instead chose to travel north. He passed Xyline Come and Darsa, then took the city of Lysinoe before accepting a tribute of fifty talents and 20,000 medimnoi each of barley and wheat from the city of Sagalassus. (Note: One medimnos of wheat weighed about 41 kilograms (90 lb), whereas one medimnoi of barley weighed around 32.5 kilograms (72 lb).) Grainger argues that 275 talents of silver and 60,000 medimnoi of grain was the minimum total loot during the marches, the food being sufficient for 41 days for about 35,000 soldiers. He notes that Vulso had extracted a substantial amount of money and food from probable Seleucid allies, thus reducing the resources they could have provided to the Seleucids for a new war.

The consul reached the Rhotrine Springs and he was once again met by Seleucus, who took the injured and sick Romans with him to Apamea and provided some guides to the Romans. Vulso, like he did during his previous marches, avoided Seleucid-controlled cities, namely Seleucia Sidera, Apollonia, Lysias and Dokimeion. The Romans instead marched from Acoridos Come to Metropolis, then to Synnada and finally Beudos. Grainger argues that the guides provided by Seleucus were not helping the Romans with navigation but with safe passage. The Romans found the cities on their route deserted; Livy says this was due to fear of the Romans, while Grainger argues it could have been a Seleucid measure to avoid skirmishes and thus protect the truce.

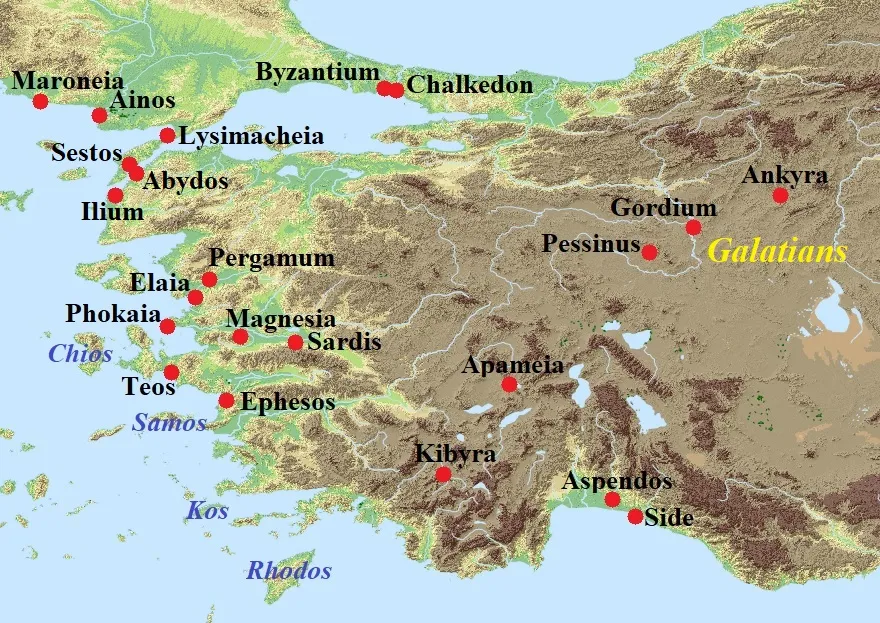
Map of Asia Minor with the major cities marked.

They soon arrived on the border with the Tolistobogii, one of the three Galatian tribes. The consul held an assembly and addressed his troops about the upcoming war. Vulso then sent envoys to Eposognatus, the chief of a section of the Tolistobogii, and the only chief who was friendly with Pergamum. He was the only Galatian chief who had chosen to not ally with the Seleucids and had not sent them troops. Eposognatus did not have power over all members of the Tolistobogii because the Galatians were not a unified polity, their tribes and chiefs could each act independently. The envoys returned and replied that the chief of the Tolistobogii had requested the Romans not to invade his territory. He also claimed that he would attempt to negotiate the surrender of the other chiefs.

The army marched deeper inland from the Alander river and pitched camp near a Galatian stronghold called Cuballum/Caballum, where Vulso had captured what is assumed to be a Galatian oppidum. While they were there, the Galatian cavalry attacked the army's advance guard, drove it back towards the Roman camp and caused significant casualties. The Roman cavalry counterattacked and drove back the Galatians, who might have broken their formations. The Galatian attack might have been intended for reconnaissance. Vulso then arrived in Abbassus, on the border of the Galatian lands; here he began negotiations with Eposognatus, a chief of the Tolistobogii. Meanwhile Vulso and his army marched, within five days, through the Axylon, an area without trees. (Note: The historian Stephen Mitchell postulates that the location of Axylon is either "the Eskişehir plain" or "the Haymana district and the central plateau". The historian David Magie notes that: "As used by modern writers, however, the Axylon denotes the 'steppe' extending from the hills north of Lake Akşehir eastward to Lake Tatta and southward to Laodiceia Catacecaumene".) He built a bridge over the Sangarius River and crossed over to its northern bank, where priests from Pessinus met him and prophesied his victory.

== Battle of Mount Olympus ==
The next day, the Romans and the Pergamese arrived at the city of Gordion and found it deserted; they nevertheless destroyed it. While encamped there, they received a messenger sent by Eposognatus. The messenger reported that Eposognatus had failed in persuading the Galatians not to attack and that they were mustering nearby in the mountains. The Tolistobogii and the Trocmi, the latter under the command of their chief Gaulotos, occupied Mount Olympus; while the Tectosagi occupied another mountain. This information was received from Oroanda, a Phrygian village in the region; Oroanda is thought to be located on the southwest bank of Lake Trogitis, modern day Lake Suğla. The location of Mount Olympus is thought to be either Çile Dağı, a hill located between Gordion and Ancyra; or Alis Daği in northern Galatia, on the border with Bithynia. On Mount Olympus, the Galatians had fortified themselves with a ditch and other defensive works. For the first two days after their arrival, the Romans scouted the mountains. During the Romans' first patrol, they were attacked by Galatian cavalry. The latter were twice the size of the Roman cavalry guarding the patrol, and the Romans were pushed back to their camp. The Galatians had deployed around 4,000 soldiers to hold a hill overlooking the route to Mount Olympus.

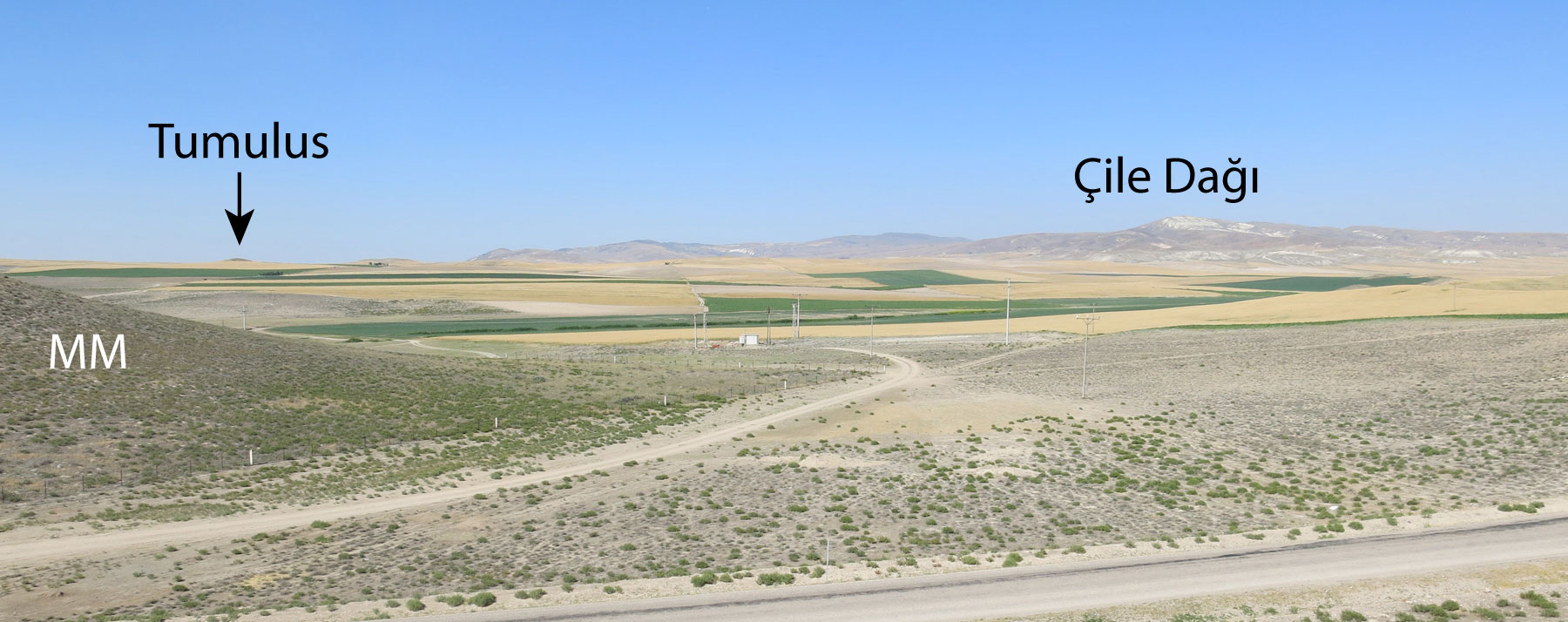
The Çile Dağı hill at top right, thought to be the site of the Battle of Mount Olympus, as seen from Gordion.

On the third day, the Romans attacked the Galatian position with their light infantry from Thrace and Trallia. The Roman auxiliary archers, slingers and javelinists inflicted heavy losses on the poorly armored Galatians, while those who attempted to enter into close combat were overcome by the superior weapons and armor of the Roman velites. When the Roman legionaries finally stormed the Galatian camp, the defenders fled down the mountains; many fell down cliffs or succumbed to attacks by the Roman-allied cavalry at the foothills. Livy's text states that the Galatians lost 40,000 people either killed or captured during this battle. Grainger notes that Livy had doubted these figures, (Note: The historian Stephen Mitchell notes: "40,000 according to Claudius Antipater; 10,000 according to the usually generous Valerius Antias, but Livy stresses the difficulty in computing the number of casualties. Prisoners could be more easily reckoned.") Grainger himself considers them to be exaggerated. A Roman unit arrived at the camp after the battle to retrieve the loot.

== Battle of Ancyra ==
A map of the course and tributaries of the Halys river, now known as the Kızılırmak in modern day Turkey.

After the Roman victory at Mount Olympus, the Tectosagi under the command of their chief Komboiomaros asked to meet Vulso for a conference halfway between their camp and Ancyra. The main aim of the conference for the Tectosagi was to delay the Roman attack so that their women and children could retreat across the Halys river. Their other aim was to assassinate Vulso at the conference. Enroute to the conference, the Romans saw the Galatian cavalry numbering around 1,000 soldiers charging at them. In the skirmish that followed, the Galatians overpowered Vulso's cavalry escort of 500 men. However, they were driven back when the cavalry numbering around 600 soldiers that had been accompanying the Roman foragers arrived and forced the Galatians to retreat.

The Romans spent the next two days scouting the surrounding area and on the third day they met the Galatian army consisting of about 50,000 to more than 60,000 men; Grainger is sceptical of this number. The Galatian cavalry had been deployed on the flanks but was used as infantry. The Romans started the battle by attacking again with their light infantry. The Galatians were once again attacked by long-range weapons; the Galatian center broke due to the first charge of the legions and fled to their camp. The flanks stood their grounds for longer but were eventually forced to retreat. The Romans chased them and plundered the Galatian camp as the surviving Galatians fled across the river to join the women, children and the Trocmi gathered across the Halys river. Eight thousand Galatians were killed and an unknown number were captured. The location of Mount Magaba, where this battle was fought, is thought to be Elmadağ, a hill around 10 miles (16 km) to the east of modern day Ankara.

== Aftermath ==
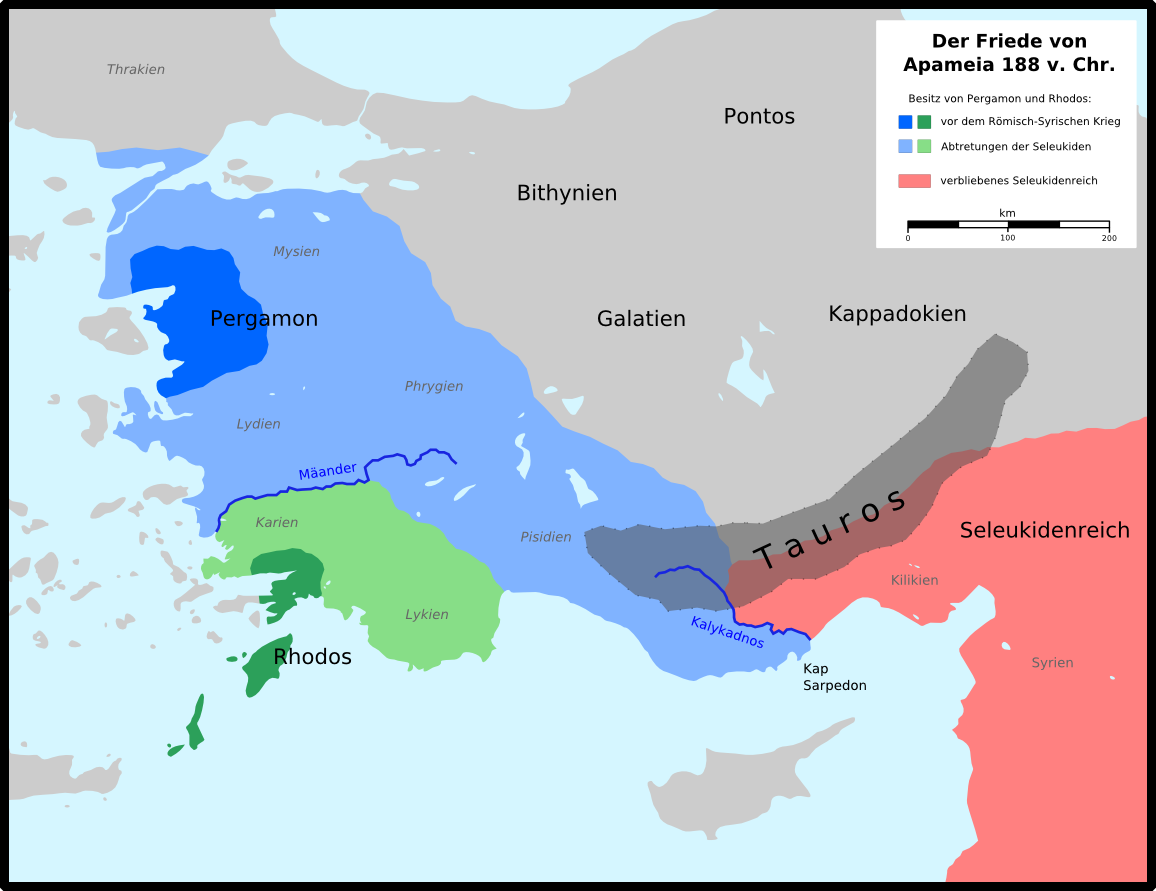
Political map of Asia Minor after the Treaty of Apamea, legend in German.

These two significant military defeats forced the Galatians to sue for peace. This campaign greatly enriched Vulso and his legions as the Galatians had gathered great wealth through their many conquests in Asia Minor. The Galatians sent envoys to Vulso asking for peace but because winter was approaching, he had returned to Ephesus. Vulso remained in Asia Minor for another year. During that time he concluded the Treaty of Apamea with Antiochus and divided the lands of the Asia Minor coast between Pergamum and Rhodes. When the Galatian envoys came, Vulso told them that King Eumenes II of Pergamum would give them the terms of the peace when he returned from Rome. The terms given to the Galatians at Lampsacus were to cease their raids and to stay confined within their own lands, however, they were not put under Roman or allied control and were left free. Envoys from cities in Asia Minor settled by Greeks came to congratulate Vulso for his victory against the Gauls. The envoys visited Vulso in the winter of either 189 or 188 BC, and gave him 212 golden wreaths as a gift.

Chiomara was the wife of Ortiagon, a Galatian chief. She was captured after the war by the Romans and raped by a centurion. When he returned her to the Galatians for a ransom, she signaled to one of her tribesman, who then killed the centurion. Chiomara then gave the head of the centurion to her husband as proof of her revenge. The historian Polybius was very impressed with her and conversed with her at Sardis; the historian Plutarch also related this account in his essay titled Bravery of Women.

Vulso began his return journey to Rome in 188 BC and arrived in 187 BC. He returned via Thrace, Macedonia, Thessaly and Epirus. On his return journey, he was attacked twice by Thracian thieves. The first attack was at Cypsela (now İpsala), where the middle of Vulso's column was attacked by 10,000 Thracians when the Roman vanguard had marched past the Thracian position and the rearguard had not yet come into their line of sight. The second attack by the Thracians was at Tempyra (Note: Tempyra was located to the east of Sale.) in southern Thrace, where the Trausi/Thrausi, a Thracian tribe, were the attackers. An unknown but significant quantity of loot was stolen by the Thracians and an unknown number of Vulso's men were killed, including Quintus Minucius Thermus, a commissioner sent to advise on the Treaty of Apamea.

When Vulso returned to Rome, he received much criticism because of his unauthorized war against the Galatians. However, he eventually overcame the opposition and was awarded a triumph by the Senate, where the proposal to approve the triumph passed with a substantial majority. At the triumph, a minimum of 52 Galatian chiefs were exhibited in chains. All soldiers of the army were paid 168 sestertii (equivalent to 42 denarii) (Note: One denarius had around 4.49 grams (0.158 oz) of silver.) each from the spoils of war, officers were paid twice as much while cavaliers were paid thrice as much. The loot Vulso brought to Rome was used by the Roman Senate to pay off the debts it had incurred during the Second Punic War. The citizens were paid through a senatus consultum, a resolution of the Roman Senate. The legionaries of Vulso's army, numbering around 10,000 men, were paid a second stipendium.

The loot from this campaign paraded at Vulso's triumph included 2,400 pounds (1,100 kg) of gold crowns, 220,000 pounds (100,000 kg) of silver, 2,103 pounds (954 kg) of gold, 127,000 Attic tetradrachmas, 16,320 gold philippics and 250,000 Attalid coins. The loot taken during this campaign was so large that all the Roman ships on the Anatolian coast could not carry it; Athenaeus had to provide the Pergamese fleet to carry the remainder. As a result of the campaign and its loot, Greco-Asiatic rituals and luxury began to be introduced to Rome. Livy and other ancient historians blamed these influences for the moral decline of the Roman Republic. Livy had observed the following about the triumph and its consequences:

These were the men who first brought into Rome bronze couches, expensive bedclothes, tapestries .... This was when girls playing harps and lutes began to appear at dinner parties ... and when a cook began to be a valued possession.

The historian Philip Kay argues that the loot brought by Manlius contributed to and drove increased spending on infrastructure, particularly by the censors of 184, 179 and 174 BC. Some projects named by Kay are the new port of and commercial infrastructure in Rome in the late 190s BC; the remodeling of the Roman sewerage system (the Cloaca Maxima) with a total expenditure of 6 million denarii; the construction and renovation of roads in Italy; and the building of large structures such as the Basilica Porcia, the Pons Aemilius, the Basilica Aemilia, and a Macellum at an unnamed location in 179 BC, among others.

== Analysis ==
=== Strategy and warfare ===
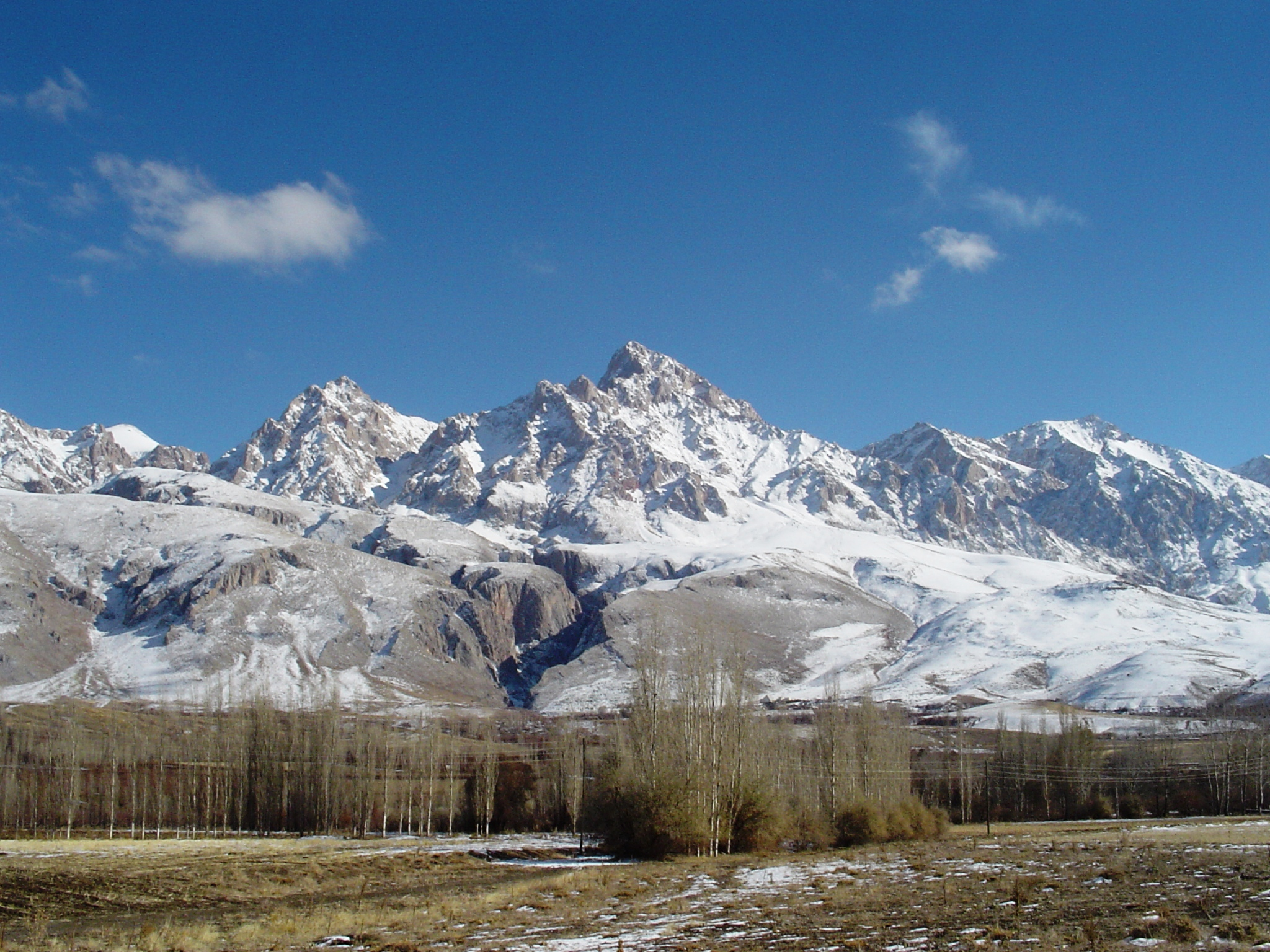
The Taurus Mountains in central Anatolia.

The historians John D. Grainger and Nels W. Førde argue that most historians have accepted Livy's account of the war without critical analysis. Grainger points out that Livy had cited his account of the war in book 38 to Lucius Furius Purpureo and Lucius Aemilius Paullus Macedonicus, both of whom were political enemies of Vulso. However, Livy also cited material from Quintus Claudius Quadrigarius, seen as a pro-Vulso historian. Book 39, which dealt with the triumph celebrated by Vulso, has been speculated to have been sourced from Valerius Antias, an anti-Vulso historian. Grainger also argues that Livy, in all likelihood, had overstated the numbers of the Galatian combatants. He argues that Vulso had been sent to attack the Galatians only as a front, and that the actual intent was to use the presence of Roman troops on Seleucid territories to claim those territories for Rome and the allies. Grainger further argues that Vulso had the powers to negotiate with the Galatians and all other kingdoms east of the Taurus Mountains, which he wouldn't have had without approval from the Senate.

Livy had written about a combined total of 4,000 soldiers deployed by Morzius (the prince of Paphlagonia) and king Ariarathes IV of Cappadocia being present near Ancyra. Grainger argues that these forces, allies of the Galatians and Seleucids, could have pulled the Romans into a war further into the Seleucid inner territories, where they would have had difficulty defending themselves against an attack by the Seleucids and their allies. Grainger further argues that only when a peace with the Seleucids was finally concluded did Vulso move from his position near Galatia, where he could have performed a flanking movement on any Seleucid reinforcements or armies arriving from Syria. The historian Felix Stähelin notes that the Rhodians suspected that the war with Galatians had been conducted partly for the benefit of the Attalids. He notes that Hannibal had sent a pamphlet to the Rhodians to this effect, perhaps to instigate them against Rome.

Grainger states that the Galatians had followed plans and their commanders had maintained control during both battles. He cites Livy who had observed that the Galatians had relied entirely on passive defenses against a possible siege, but had not armed themselves with long range ballistic weapons. Grainger notes that their cavalry had been very effective, but they had used it erringly at Ancyra as infantry. Grainger argues that the strategy of the Galatians had been to keep the Roman army in the vicinity of their mountainous strongholds till winter arrived, when they would be cut off. However, he writes that the Galatians had been either incompetent at or unaware of military tactics and the weapons in use at the time. He observes that the Galatians opted for mountain warfare even though their cavalry could have been used more impactfully on open fields. He uses these observations to posit that the Galatians had given up the frequent raids they had been known for.

The historian Karl Strobel, however, contends that the Galatians had resumed their raids in Asia Minor at the beginning of the 2nd century BC. He also argues that Vulso's victories have been overstated in ancient and modern literature. The historian Heinz Heinen argues that Vulso's campaign completed the long historical process of confining the Galatians to Galatia; their first settlements in Asia Minor had been in the coastal regions. Strobel, however, contends that the Galatians had probably settled in Galatia out of their own will. Heinen also argues that Vulso's campaign put an end to the "great age of the Celtic mercenary".

The historian Bernhard Kremer argues that Vulso had already assessed that the Galatians would avoid a decisive battle and instead retreat to the hills. Kremer notes how Manlius had told his soldiers before the battle about the Galatians' low endurance, and how they could be defeated if their initial energetic attacks were repulsed. Kremer argues that Vulso knew how the Galatians fought because his ancestor, Titus Manlius Torquatus, had already fought them. Kremer notes Livy's statements that the Galatian swords were too large for close combat and their shields were too small to cover their large bodies.

=== Logistics and finances ===
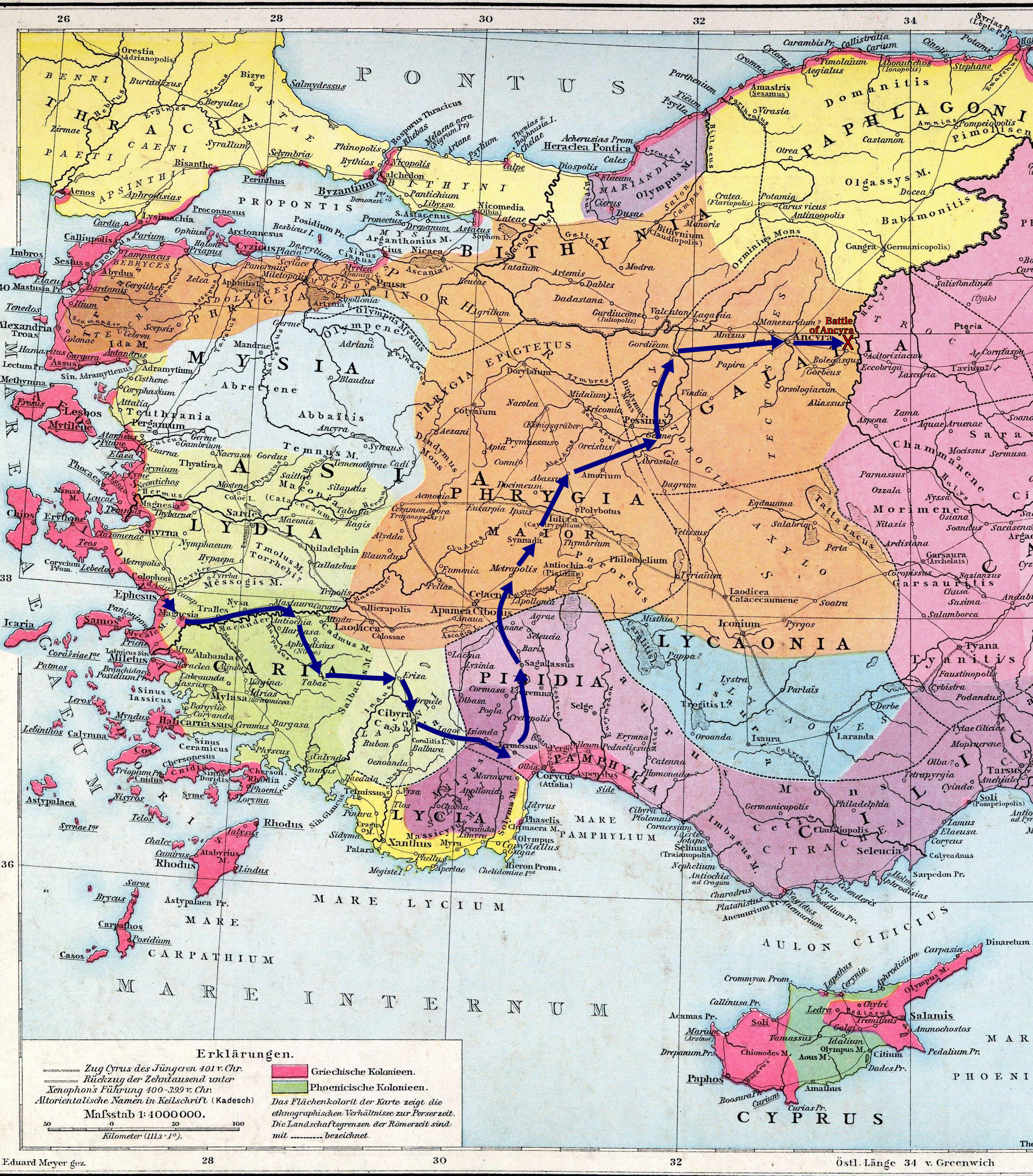
A map showing the route most likely to be the one Vulso took on his march to Galatia.

Livy notes that after marching from Antiochia, it took the Roman allied army three days to cover a distance of 20 Roman miles, (Note: A Roman mile is equivalent to around 0.92 miles (1.48 km; 4,900 ft; 1,620 yd).) a pace of 6 and 1/3rd miles a day. Livy states that the army had marched at the speed of five miles a day from Acoridos Come to Beudos. Grainger argues this is likely an understatement; the army had covered the 50 miles between the two cities in four days, it had then marched 48 miles in the subsequent three days. This is a distance of 98 miles covered in seven days, with the average pace being 14 miles a day.

The archaeologist George Ewart Bean cites the British archaeologist William Mitchell Ramsay for retracing Vulso's route; both of them had travelled through the modern locations corresponding to the places Vulso had marched past. Ramsay had proposed that Vulso had travelled from Sinda via Comama, Pogla and Andeda to reach Cormasa. Bean posits that the route Vulso had most likely used was via modern day Ürkütlü to Hacıbekâr, then going northward, crossing the Samasbeli Pass and reaching the heights around Aziziye and Bozlar. Bean posits that Vulso would then have marched from modern Aziziye to the Lysis river valley between Kozluca and Elmacık, and then finally to Cormasa. Bean notes that this march from Ürkütlü to Cormasa took Vulso two days according to Livy, and that Vulso then marched to the territory of Sagalassus near modern day Düver and Yazıköy.

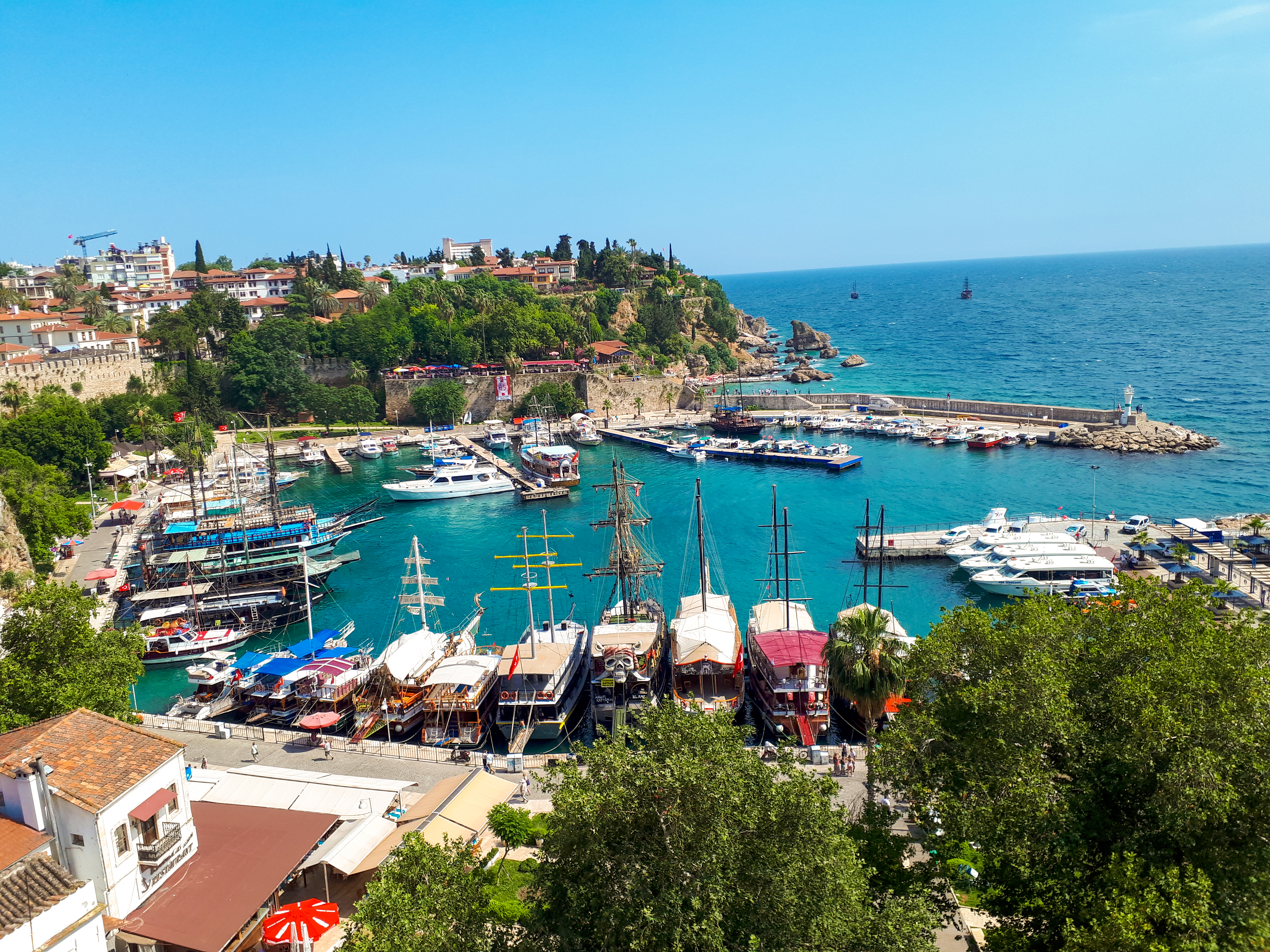
The harbor in Attalia, modern day Antalya, where Vulso may have received his supplies.

Førde argues that the army had marched south towards Termessos to receive supplies from Roman ships docking at the port of Attalia (modern day Antalya), which may have been carrying materials received through the tithe levied on Roman Sicily. He also argues that one of the reasons why the army had camped at Abbassus, on the border with the Galatians, was to receive supplies sent from Attalia.

Grainger has used details provided by Livy to calculate the total loot taken during the campaigns in Asia Minor. Vulso's distribution of the loot to the soldiers was estimated at 308 talents or 18.5 million denarii, the government's share of the loot after making these distributions was estimated at 26.3 talents of gold and 264.1 talents of silver. (Note: A talent weighed around 22.42 kilograms (49.4 lb).) Vulso's share of the loot is unknown but is thought to be substantial. Vulso also had to pay a year's extra salary to his army on their return to Rome as pledged by Scipio; an infantryman's yearly pay was 108 denarii in this period.

The historian Michael Taylor arrives at an estimate of ~24 million denarii for the value of Vulso's loot and ~2.6 million denarii for the value of the distributions to the soldiers. Taylor estimates that the remaining 21.6 million denarii were distributed as repayments to Roman citizens; the formula used by the urban quaestors of the Roman government was refunding every assidui 25.5 asses for every 1000 asses of the assessed value of their property. This calculation has been inverted to arrive at an estimate of 900 million denarii for the total valuation of the property held by Roman taxpayers.
