= Anabura =

Anabura or Anaboura (Ancient Greek: Ἀνάβουρα) or Anabora (Αναβωρα) may refer to:

- Anabura (Phrygia), which may have later been the site of:
  - Augustopolis in Phrygia, Ancient city, former bishopric and Latin Catholic titular see in Phrygia, near Surmeneh (modern Sürmene)
  - Çobanlar, town and district of Afyonkarahisar Province in the Aegean region of Turkey
- Anabura (Pisidia)
