= Battle of Mount Olympus =

188 BCE battle

Battle Map of Mount Olympus
- Part of Galatian War
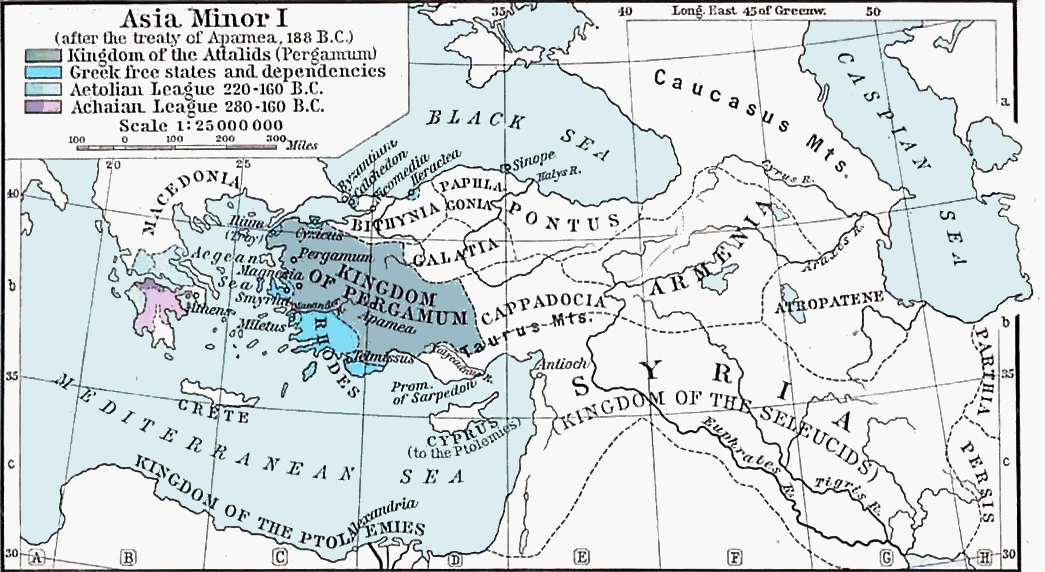
- A map of Asia Minor at the time.
Date	189 BC
Location	Mount Olympus in Galatia, Asia Minor (perhaps Çile Dağı or Alis Daği in modern Turkey)
Result	Roman-Pergamese Victory

Belligerents
Galatian Gauls	Roman Republic, Pergamum

Commanders and leaders
-	Gnaeus Manlius Vulso, Attalus

Strength
Over 50,000	-

Casualties and losses
10,000 dead, 30,000 captured	Light

The Battle of Mount Olympus was fought in 189 BC between the Galatian Gauls of Asia Minor and an alliance consisting of the Roman Republic and Pergamum. The battle ended in a crushing allied victory. Livy is the main source for this battle, and his description can be found in book 38, chapters 17–23.

== Prelude ==
In 191 BC, Antiochus III of the Seleucid Empire invaded Greece. This caused him to come into conflict with the Romans who defeated him in Greece and followed him into Asia Minor. In Asia Minor, the Romans with their allies Pergamum defeated Antiochus at the Battle of Magnesia. This forced the Seleucids to sue for peace and to abandon Asia Minor.

In 189, Scipio Asiaticus was replaced as consul by Gnaeus Manlius Vulso. One of his tasks was to conclude the treaty that Scipio had been arranging with Antiochus. When he arrived, he addressed the troops and commended them on their victory over the Seleucids and proposed a new war, a war against the Galatian Gauls of Asia Minor.

The pretext he used for the invasion was that the Galatians had supplied soldiers to the Seleucid army at the Battle of Magnesia. The principal reason for the invasion was Manlius' desire to seize the wealth of the Galatians who had become rich from plundering their neighbours and to gain glory for himself.

Vulso was joined in Ephesus by Attalus, the brother of King Eumenes II of Pergamum. Attalus brought with him some infantry and cavalry, and with these reinforcements Vulso began his march inland. During the march inland through Asia Minor, Vulso extracted tribute from the cities along the way, as well as intervening in conflicts.

When the army reached the border with Galatia, the consul addressed his troops about the upcoming war and then sent envoys to Eposognatus, chieftain of the Tectosagi which was one of the three Galatian tribes. The envoys returned and replied that the chieftain of the Tectosagi begged the Romans not to invade his territory. He also claimed that he would attempt to force the submission of the other chieftains.

== Battle ==
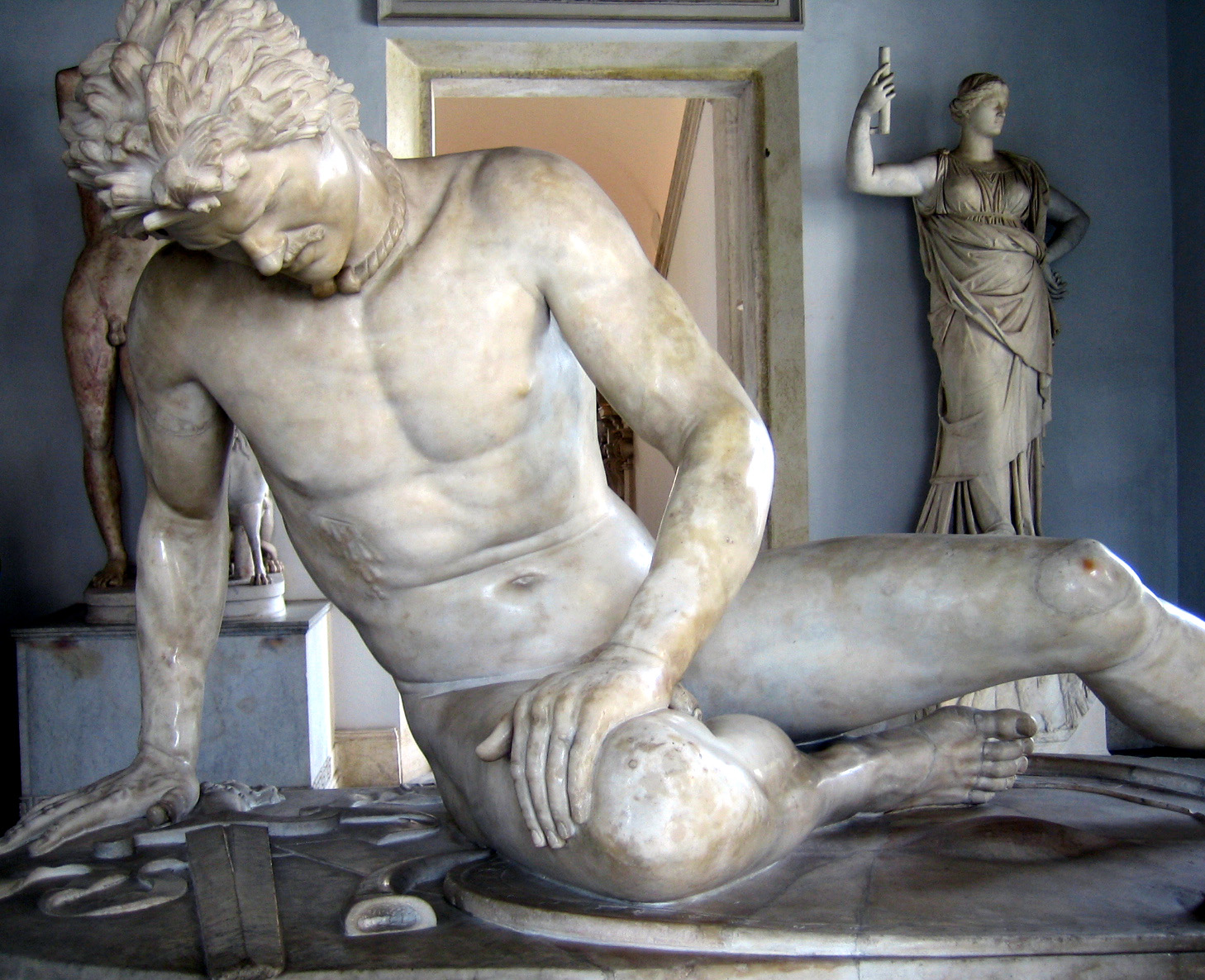
Hellenistic Greek impression of a Galatian soldier.

The battle began as did many battles in the Roman Republic, with the launching of missiles and skirmishing of light troops. Livy claims that the Gauls fared badly right from the start, unable to protect themselves against the number of missiles being launched at them. They tried to retaliate with stones, but were not only unskilled in throwing them, but the stones themselves were too small to be of any help.

Livy goes on to describe the panic and hopelessness of the Gallic situation, seemingly trapped in a war of missiles: a type of warfare to which they were unsuited. When the Gauls rushed the light infantry, the Roman velites, in a rarely described instance of hand-to-hand combat, slew the enraged and hysterical Gauls with their swords.

The standards of the legions began to advance on the Gauls which caused them to fall back in panic, retreating to their camp. The Romans occupied the surrounding hills and trapped their enemy, at which point the consul ordered his soldiers to rest temporarily. During this time, the light infantry gathered what missiles they could that were lying around the battlefield and prepared for a second attack. The Gauls prepared for the assault by stationing themselves in front of the walls of their camp, as the camp itself was insufficiently built to serve as a fortification.

The consul once again ordered the light infantry to commence the battle, and describes the onslaught that the Gauls faced:

They were then deluged by missiles of every kind; and since the more numerous and close-packed the defenders were, the less did any weapons fall harmlessly between them, they were at once forced within the rampart, leaving strong guards only at the very approaches to the gates. A huge number of missiles was hurled at the crowd herded into the camp, and the shouting, mingled with the lamentations of the women and children, denoted that many were wounded.

At this point, the heavy infantry advanced, throwing their javelins, and causing even more panic. The Gauls fled from the camp in all directions, whom the consul ordered to pursue. Finally, the cavalry having not played any role in the battle, eventually joined the pursuit, capturing and killing many Gauls.

== Aftermath ==
Livy notes that calculating the exact number of the dead was made difficult by how scattered their bodies were (from having fled the camp). The victory brought immense plunder to the Roman Republic, and for all the soldiers involved.
Vulso would meet the Gauls in battle again, not long afterwards at the Battle of Ancyra.
