= Beudos =

Town of ancient Phrygia

Coordinates: 38°32′52″N 30°38′33″E

Beudos, also known as Palaion Beudos or Beudos Vetus (both meaning 'old Beudos'), was a town of ancient Phrygia, inhabited during Hellenistic, Roman, and Byzantine times. Livy, when describing the march of Manlius, places five Roman miles from Synnada, and between Synnada and Anabura.

Its site is located near Yarışlı in Asiatic Turkey.
