= Macellum of Pompeii =

Mall at the forum of Pompeii

Macellum
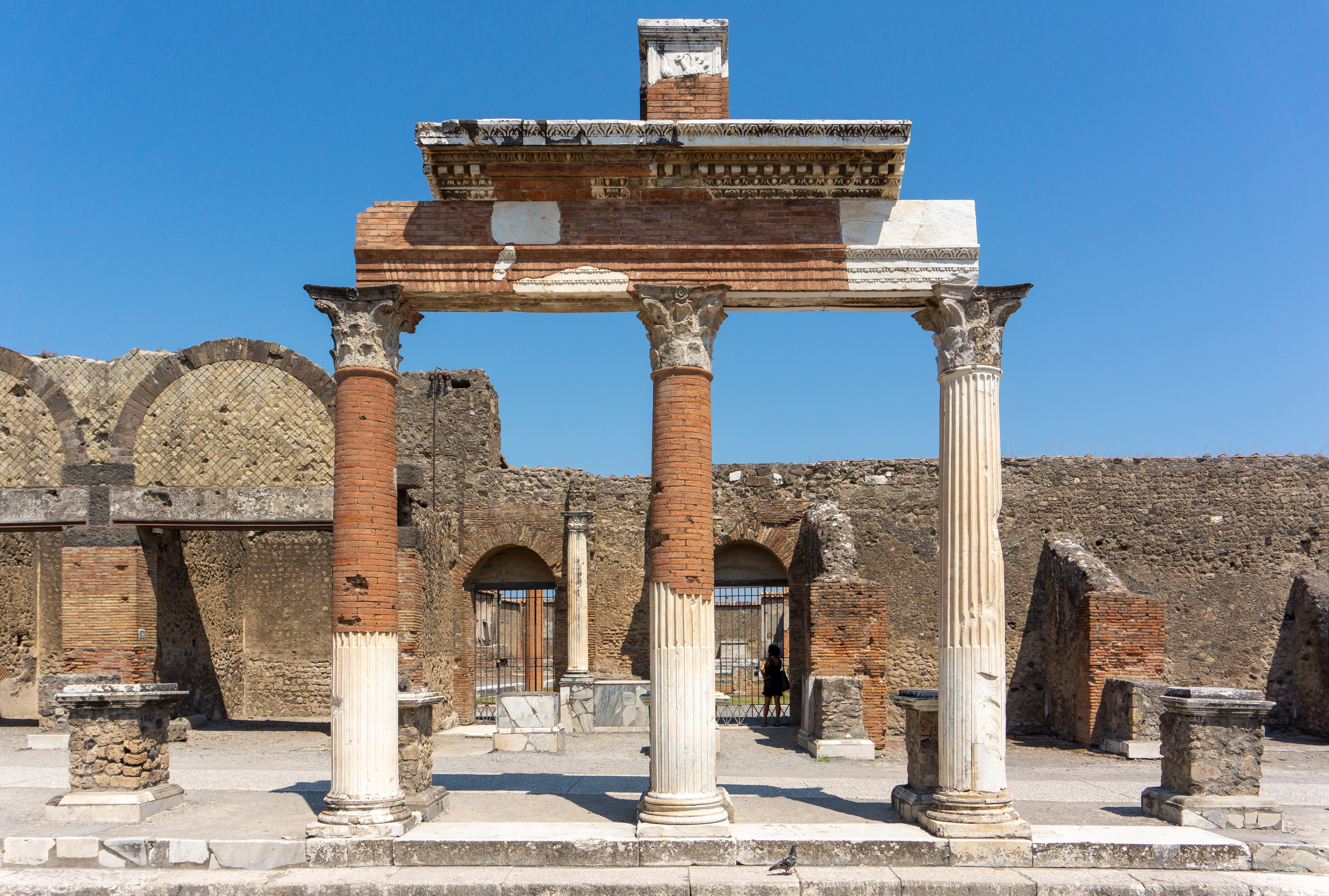
- Portico in front of the entrance to the Macellum
- Interactive map of Macellum
- 40°45′00″N 14°29′05″E
- Location: Pompeii, Forum

History
- Built: 3rd century BC

The Macellum of Pompeii was located on the Forum and, as the provision market (or macellum) of Pompeii, was one of the focal points of the ancient city. The building was constructed in several phases. When the earthquake of 62 AD destroyed large parts of Pompeii, the Macellum was also damaged. Archeological excavations in the modern era have revealed a building that had still not been fully repaired by the time of the eruption of Mount Vesuvius in 79 AD.

Of particular interest to researchers is the section of the Macellum located on the east side that is thought to have been dedicated to the imperial cult. It makes manifest how central a role the emperors played in the lives of Romans as early as the 1st century. The other rooms on the west side are also interesting as examples of the link between economic and public life. Additionally, the market is an eloquent testimony to the everyday culture of the Romans, which is illustrated by archeological finds such as food remains, items of daily use and necessity, up to examples of Roman wall paintings.

== Location ==
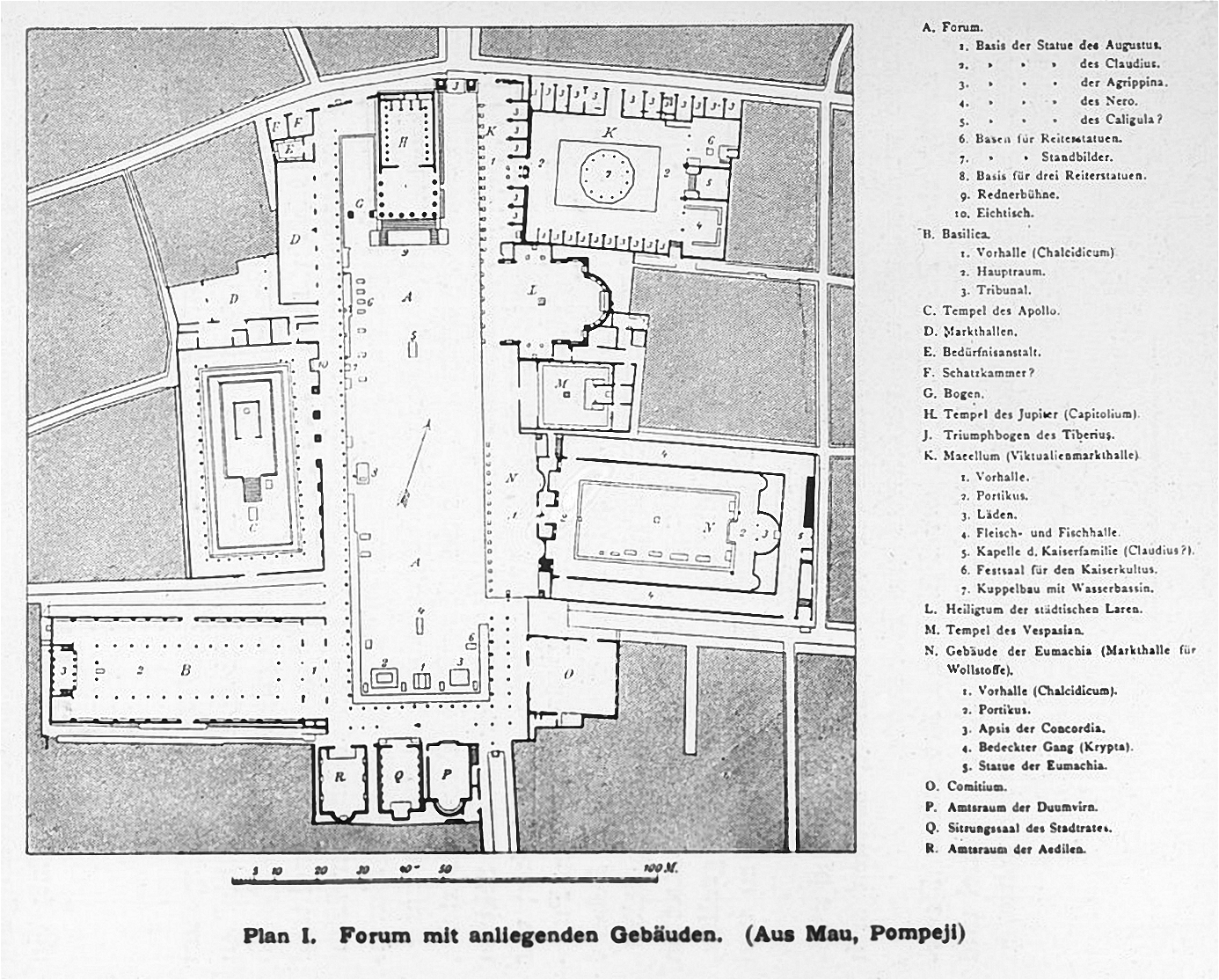
An older plan of the forum by August Mau. The Macellum is the building in the upper right corner.

The Macellum of Pompeii is located outside the northeast corner of the forum. As the city continued to grow, it was necessary to relieve pressure on the forum. When the Macellum was first discovered, because of the twelve column bases in the centre, the excavators at first believed it was a kind of pantheon, a temple dedicated to many gods. However, when subsequent excavation turned up the remains of cereals and fruits in the north side of the building and fish scales and bones in the middle of the courtyard, the archaeologists realized that this was a market.

The Macellum had three entrances: two main entrances, one in the middle of the west side to the forum and one in the middle of the north side to Via degli Augustali (a local road), plus a side entrance on the southeast that could only be reached using a small stairway.

The shape of the Macellum is slightly misaligned with the forum because it had to fit between the two roads that flanked it to the north and south, the Via degli Augustali and the Vico del Balcone Pensile. To compensate, the shops that abut the forum on the west side increase in size from south to north.

== Construction features ==
=== Entrance and the West Side ===
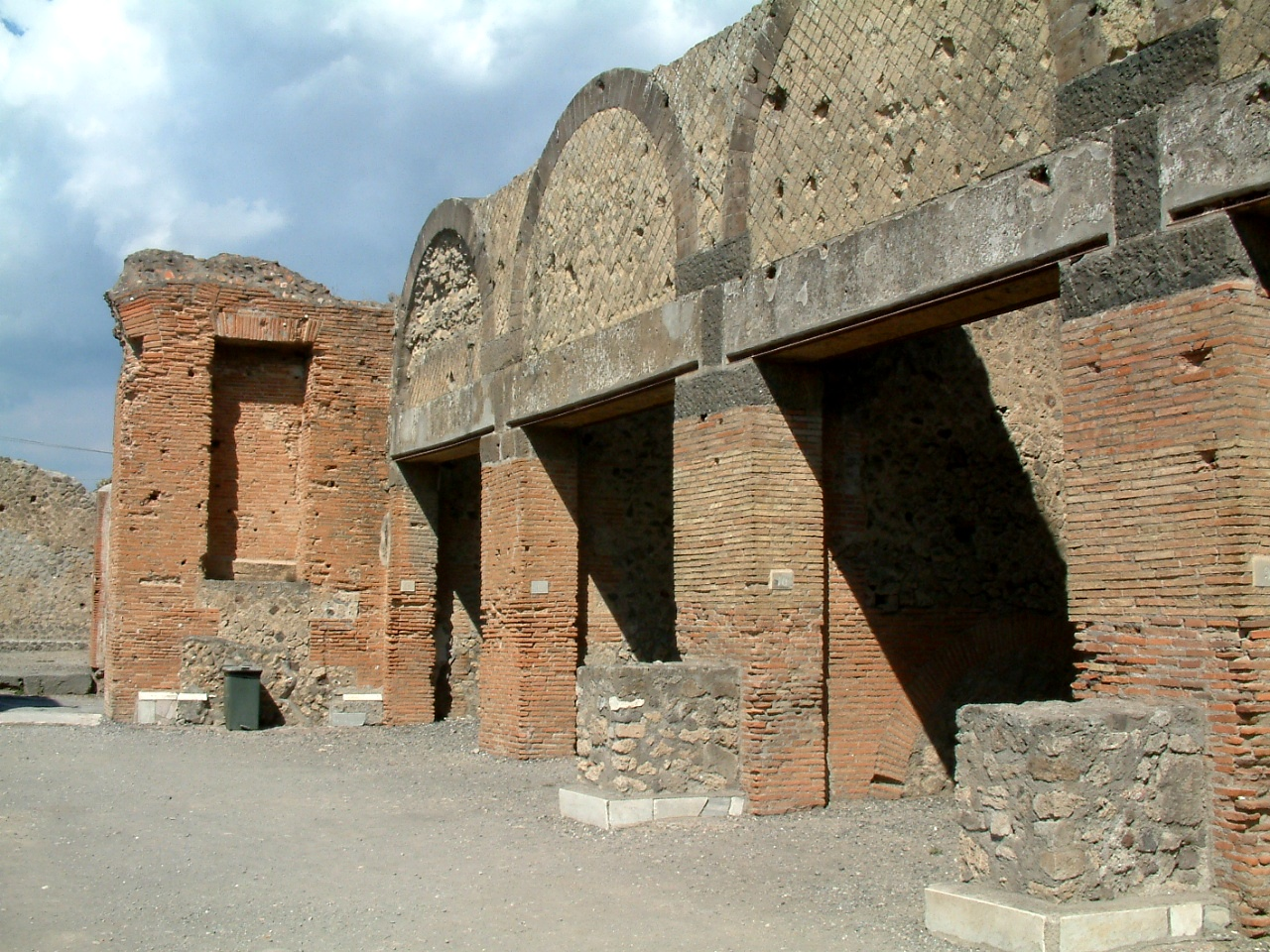
Macellum of Pompeii - View from the outside to the tabernae

Three much restored marble columns from the portico of the forum, with Corinthian capitals, remain standing in front of the facade. The lower third of two of the columns is decorated with piped fluting, while the upper portion lacks fluting. Part of the entablature remains on top of the capitals. The lobby of the Macellum was particularly closely connected to the portico of the forum. Two rows of columns rose one above the other with no intermediary level. Hence, the portico appeared more like a facade.

The bases for honorific statues, which stood behind each column, are also still in place, but they lack their original marble cladding. Further bases for honorific statues were located in front of the corner columns of the tabernae (shops) at the front of the building. These spaces constructed in opus incertum (rubble stonework) were probably currency exchanges. A further portico must have been located inside the Macellum itself, but none of its columns remain. The only recognizable traces are a water gully and signs of where columns stood in it.

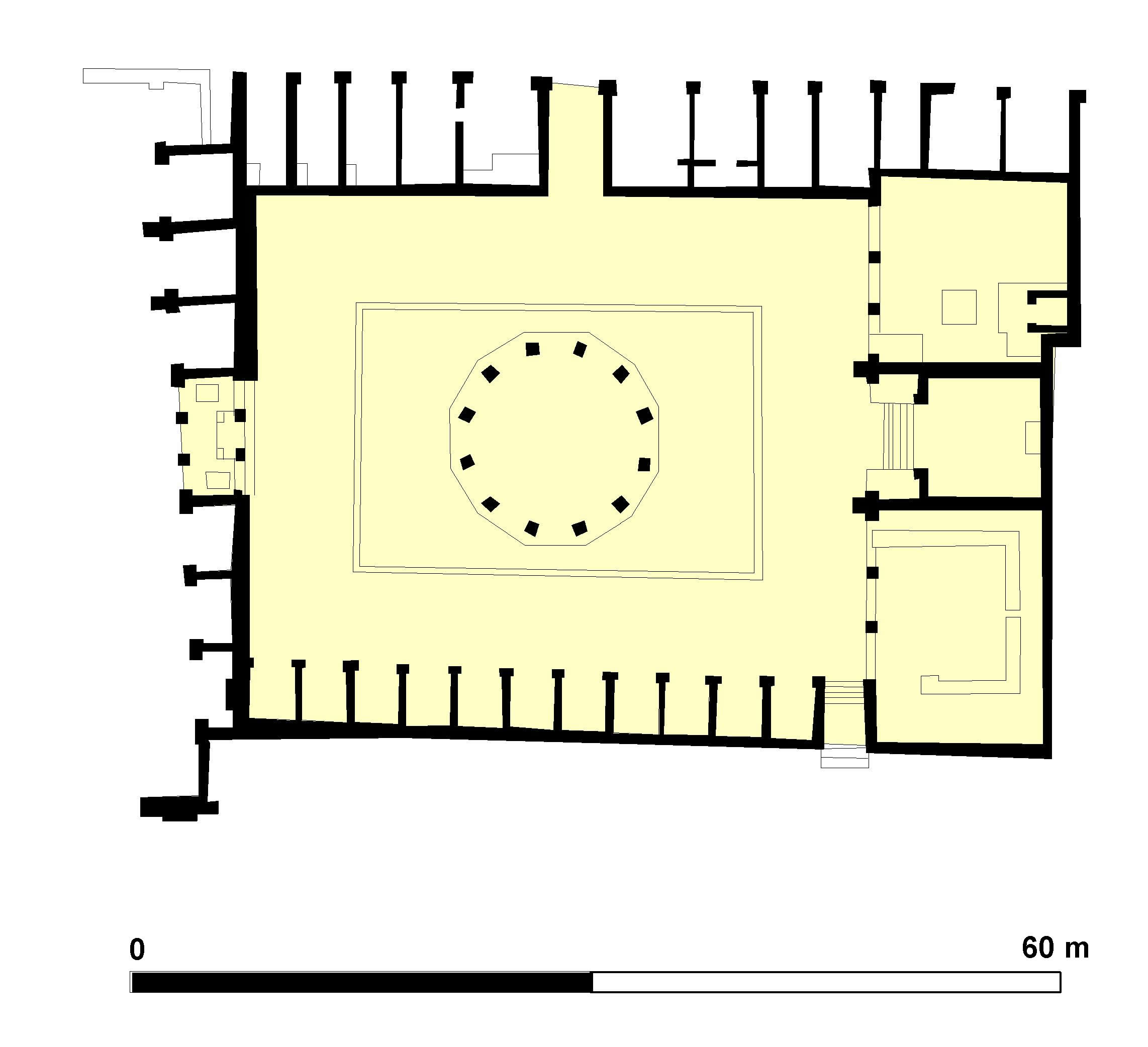
Sketch of the Macellum

The main entrance was divided into two by an aedicula for a statue with two elegant Corinthian columns. The statue was probably that of an emperor, in which case, the imperial cult is to be presumed to have begun at the entrance to the Macellum. Both columns are decorated with chimerae, which were not originally part of the Macellum, but belonged to one of the major tombs: the Tomba delle Ghirlande (Garland grave) on Via del Sepolchri (Street of Sepulchres) before the Herculaneum gate. The chimerae were presumably not produced in Pompeii, but probably originate in a workshop in Greece. However, it is also possible that they were manufactured in a neo-Attic workshop in Naples or Puteoli.

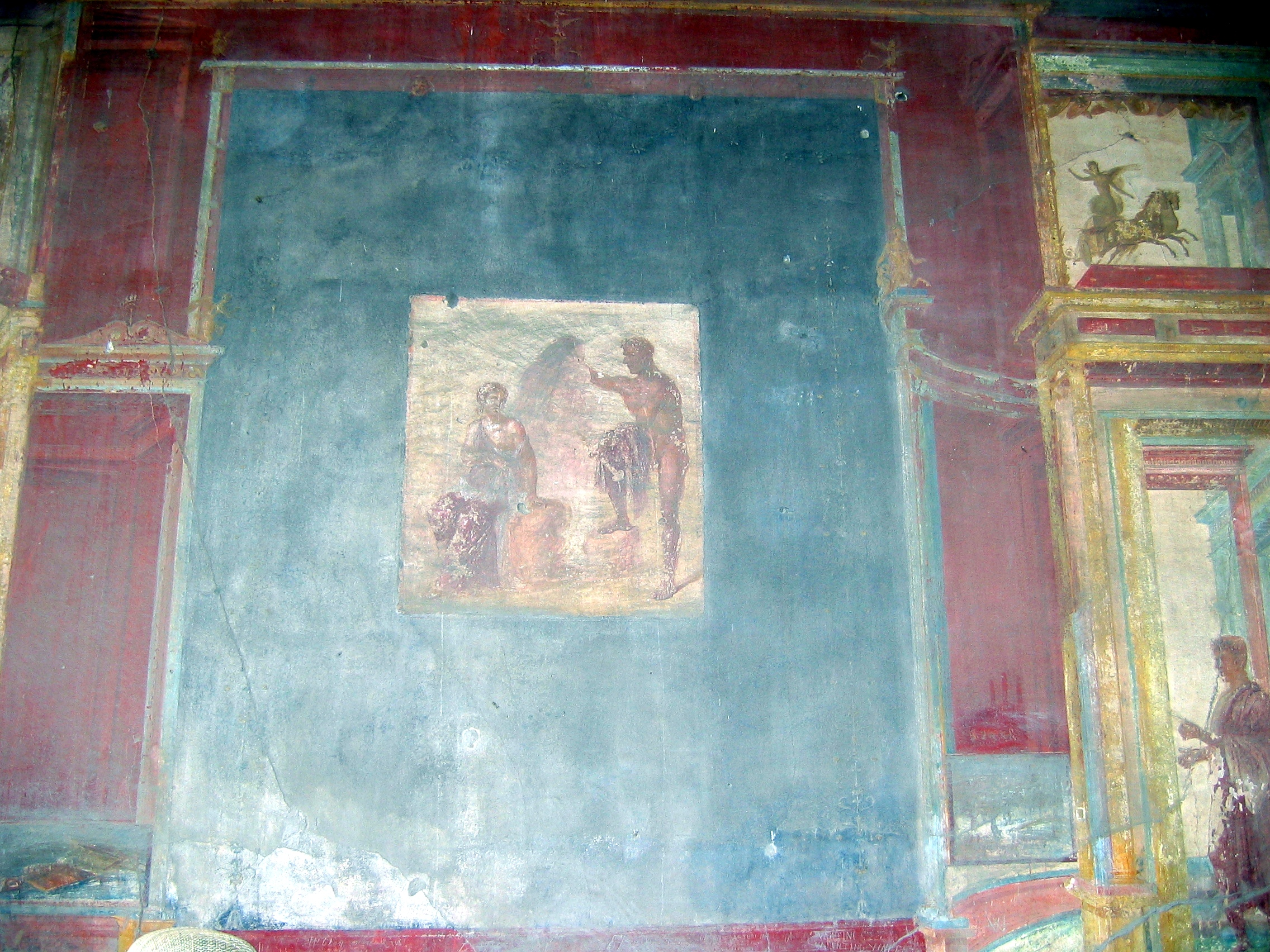
Mural painting in the 4th style

In addition, on the west side an example of the fourth style of Roman (so-called Pompeiian) decorative mural painting has been preserved. It apparently dates to the period after the great earthquake of 62 CE. Above the plinth are painted fields of black bordered in red. In the center of each, a mythological scene is depicted. In these Penelope recognizing the returned Odysseus, Io watched over by Argus, and Medea ruminating on the deaths of her children are recognizable. Between the individual panels are architectural vistas on a white background, with green and pale red buildings depicted in perspective.

The delicate architectonic elements dominate the black panels and divide the upper area into fields in which single figures are depicted on a blue background. A girl with sacrificial equipment and a satyr playing an aulos can be seen. Above these, on large wall panels are painted still lifes with birds, poultry, wine-jars, fruit, flowers, baskets, and fish in a style similar to folk art. These depictions facilitate the identification of the building as a macellum. Another picture shows a donkey being crowned with garlands by Cupids. Millstones can be seen beside it. This painting probably symbolizes the festival of Vesta, on which the donkeys were relieved of work.

=== Courtyard, North and South ===
From the entrance, one enters a large courtyard. No traces were found of the portico that should be here; it is very likely that it was destroyed in the earthquake of 62 CE and not yet rebuilt by the time of the eruption. In fact excavation revealed the travertine base (stylobate) for the colonnade on the north side and for a small one on the west side. Presumably the portico columns had not yet been erected at all. This was not the only evidence of reconstruction: The walls of the inner enclosure and the spaces to the south and east also date to the post-62 restoration. They consist of opus incertum. Only the corner columns are constructed of brick and small tuff cubes in opus listatum (masonry in which bricks alternate with small stones).

Twelve food stores were located on both sides of the side entrance. They were located on the north side so that their wares would be protected from strong sunlight and kept fresh. Figs, grapes, chestnuts, pulses, bread, cakes, amphorae, and fruits in jars (now in the Naples Museum) were found here. The Tabernae opened onto the Via delli Augustali and were not connected to the interior of the Macellum. The east wall and western portions of the north wall are of opus incertum to a height of 1.35 m, above which they consist of limestone and tuff. Above the stores there would have been attics in which butcher's assistants and other staff lived. A wooden gallery ran in front of the attics. Since no interior stairs were found, access must have been from outside the Macellum.

On the south side, directly adjacent to the meat and fish hall on the Via del Balcone Pensile, is the third entrance. After the lararium was erected, the Via del Balcone Pensile became a cul-de-sac. To the height of the shrine (approximately 13 m), the external wall was constructed of opus reticulatum (masonry of rectangular stones arranged like a checkerboard or net). This masonry consists of multicolored tuff stones arranged in rows and enclosed by brick pilasters. This colorful display made a stucco coating unnecessary. In the opinion of some archeologists, this may be the finest example of a wall from the last phase of building at Pompeii. It abuts a wall of opus incertum (clearly older masonry, presumably from an earlier stage of construction). Within the Macellum on the south side are twelve shops. They are altogether roughly the same in size and construction. They were intended for the sale of foodstuffs, probably meat and fish.

=== Central structure ===
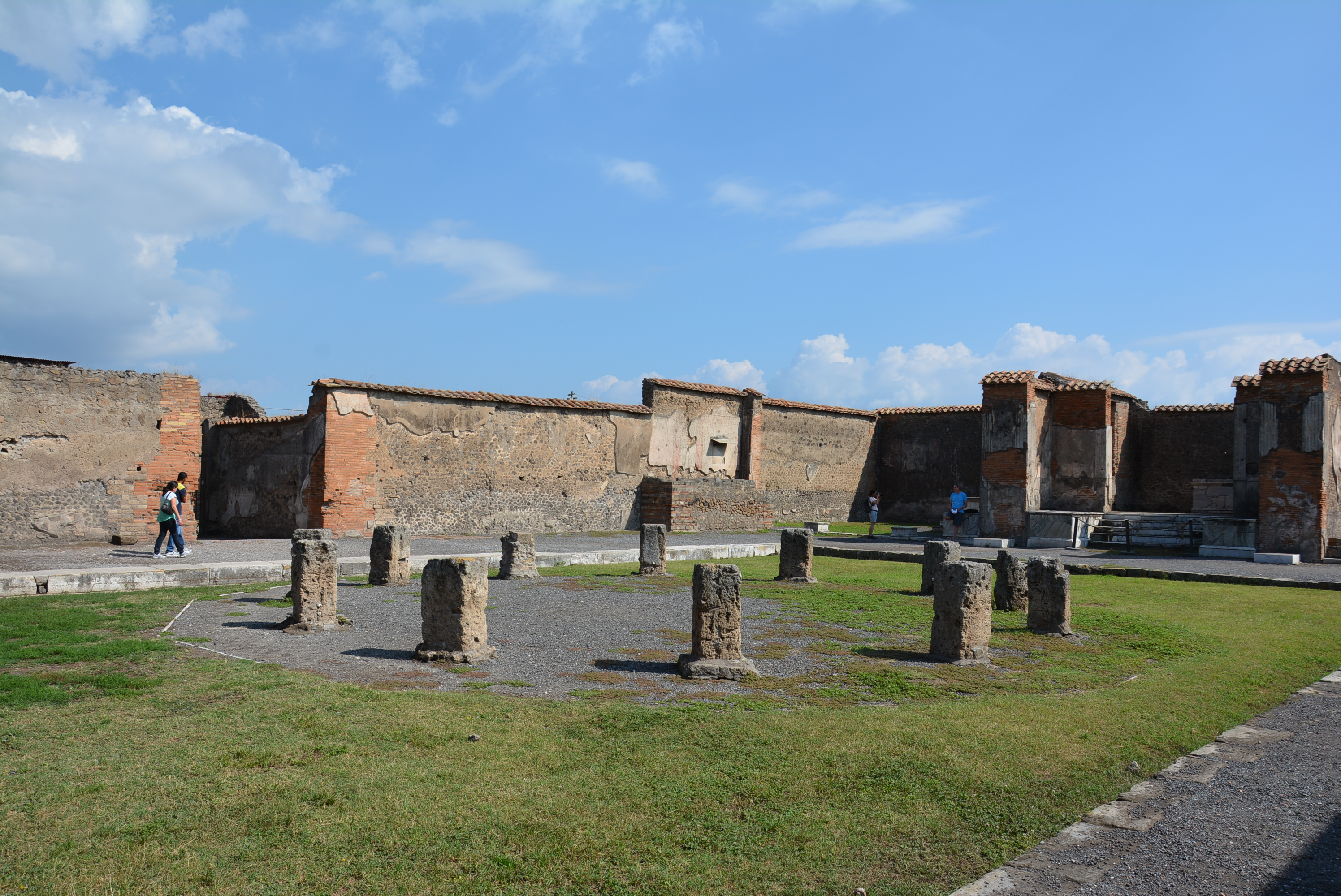
The remains of the central structure

In the middle of the Macellum are the previously mentioned twelve column bases, which are made of tuff and arranged to define a dodecagonal space. They were initially thought to be remnants of a round shrine or tholos. A well and pool would have been located within it. The rotunda was thought to have resembled other macella, perhaps the elaborate Eastern Greek and African models, or Roman examples such as that in Puteoli. However, Amedeo Maiuri's excavations clarified that the column bases and the space within them had a different function. As proven by the many fish bones and scales discovered in the drainage trough that flowed into the middle, the space was intended for selling fish. They were gutted and cleaned here.

The twelve column bases held wooden poles, which were embedded in the earth and anchored by the bases. The poles supported a wooden roof. There was presumably a well in the middle of the space, but there was no pool. The bases were restored in the 19th century, after having been discovered in very poor condition. The inner area is edged with a low marble lip, intended to prevent water from the middle flooding outward. The flooring consists of a mixture of crushed stone tiles, made of travertine, marble, and mortar. When this area was excavated by a group led by Giuseppe Fiorelli, it was still considered to be a kind of pantheon and thus initially given that name.

=== Imperial cult room ===
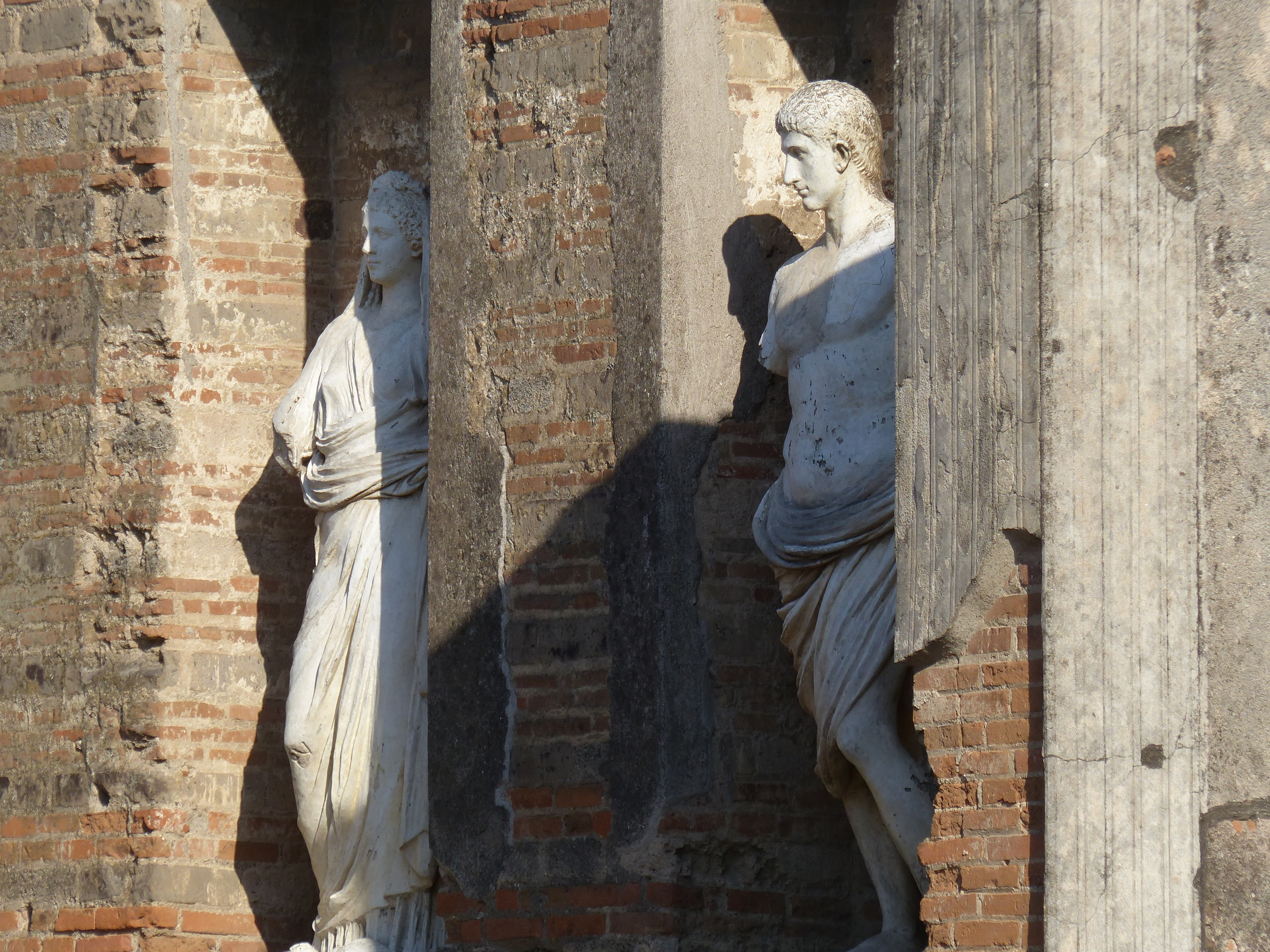
Replicas of imperial statues

Three other rooms were located on the east side. They are on a higher level than the rest of the Macellum. The space in the middle was dedicated to the imperial family, the imperial cult room. Some books designate this space the sacellum, or chapel. It is accessed via a five-step stairway. In comparison to the rest, this room is very simple in its decor. The entrance was decorated with a bar pattern. There is a pedestal on the back wall, and two niches are recessed into the side walls on each side.

In the niches on the right are plaster casts (poor copies in the opinion of some archeologists) of the two statues which were found here. The originals are now in the National Museum of Naples. They were erroneously believed to be likenesses of Marcellus and Octavia. Marcellus was the patron of Pompeii, so the supposition was valid. The figures in the other niches were presumed to be Agrippina and Nero. Today they are believed to be two other as yet unidentified members of the imperial family. Additionally, an arm with a globe in its hands was found here. It perhaps belonged to the statue of the emperor.

In the view of Heinrich Nissen, the rear wall of the room had already been broken through in antiquity and three of the five statues removed. Further, he saw only two possible combinations of statues:

1. In the central position a statue of Augustus as Jupiter with a globe in his hand, in the niches to the right Livia and Drusus, and in the niches to the left Tiberius and Germanicus.
2. More likely, however, a statue of Jupiter stood on the pedestal in the center of the rear wall and Livia and Augustus stood in the niches on the left and Drusus and Tiberius in those on the right. During his lifetime, Augustus never had himself portrayed as Jupiter with the globe.

Nissen regarded the two extant statues as Livia and Drusus. He cited in support of this identification that the following inscription may have been located under the statue he identified as Livia:

AVGVSTAE.IVLIAe
DRVSI.F
DIVI.AVGVSTI
D.D.

Over a hundred years later, Paul Zanker put forward the view that Augustus did have himself depicted as Jupiter and that in the niches on the right were people honored by the city who had earned recognition around the market. The man, who had probably already died at the time the statue was erected, was depicted in a heroically exaggerated manner on the model of the emperor, with draped hips and bare upper torso. The woman is depicted as a priestess, with a wreath and a container of incense. She was perhaps the sacerdos publica, who played an important role as patroness.

The walls here are opus listatum and opus incertum. The side walls of the staircase are constructed in opus latericium (brickwork). Unfortunately only a few traces of the original stucco overlay have been preserved.

=== Association and meat sales rooms ===
The room adjoining the imperial cult room on the left was probably used for sacrificial feasts and religious ceremonies by the collegium or association responsible for conducting the imperial cult. Considering the surroundings, it is not likely that gods other than the genius of the emperor were honored here. According to other, older theories, it was the banqueting room of a merchant cooperative, or the seat of the market court. Immediately to the left of the entrance to this room, over a thousand coins were found. This could represent the treasury of a collegium or a merchant's daily take.. Other sources report that the treasure was found immediately at the northern entrance or in the meat sales room. Sheep skeletons, ox skulls, and bones were found in front of the association room; presumably there was at this point an area set apart for sacrificial animals or an enclosure for animals that were for sale.

In the interior, an altar is visible placed to the right. It consists of two layers of marble with a basalt plate lying on top. The plate has a raised edge and a hole in one corner, which suggests that the altar was used for libations. The significance of the marble-clad podium beside the south wall remains unclear. It has been suggested that like the large side niches in the Building of Eumachia, it served as a place for the praecones (announcers or heralds) and the argentarii (money-changers) to stand. But the presumed religious significance of the room argues against this hypothesis. Two small murals of Cupids were also found here. In one painting they are seen drinking wine and playing a lyre; in the other they are depicted performing sacrifices. Nissen proposed that the podium served as the location of the images of the lares. In the room to the right of the imperial cult room, fish and meat were sold. A shop counter runs around three sides (north, east and south) of this room. There is a single break in this counter in the middle of the east wall, and on the south wall the counter ends after roughly a quarter of the length of the wall. The left half of the counter surface is equipped with a special device that served to collect the runoff water and direct it into a small drainage groove on the south side. This half was probably intended for the sale of fish. The entire counter inclines slightly, so that liquids could drain away.

== Construction history ==
Investigation of the construction history of the Macellum dates to Amedeo Maiuri. The building seen today has been dated to 130-120 BCE, but was preceded by an earlier building of similar dimensions on the same site. That building, however, had no central rotunda. On the north and south sides, the layout of the original portico corresponded to that in the later building; on both the east and west sides, in contrast, it was more spacious. On the south side there was a row of tabernae that were not as deep and differently partitioned. On the east side there were some rooms with attractive wall decorations in the first style and a second colonnade at the front.

The facade differed from that of the later building: it stood further forward, closer to the forum. The open marketplace was covered with a carefully polished and neatly compacted stone pavement. The tabernae had a floor made of stone chips and a mortar layer. In the rooms on the east side, the mortar was mixed with crushed bricks (called opus signinum). In the uncovered marketplace, the paving was in use until 62 CE; in the indoor spaces it was gradually replaced by opus signinum.

In the Julio-Claudian period, the complex was reorganized and took on its final form. The original tuff colonnades were initially retained, but on the west side were cut through to erect a sacred aedicula of opus incertum, which was rapidly again forgotten. The tabernae on the west and north sides also belong to this phase of construction. However, the majority of the building dates from the period after the earthquake of 62 CE, which then led to the complete abandonment of the tuff colonnades.

Only the lower story is preserved, but there was also an upper floor, in which there are presumed to have been attic quarters for Macellum workers. Access to the upper story was by means of a wooden stairway leading to a wooden gallery from which it was possible to reach the rooms.

== Sources ==
- Filippo Coarelli (ed.), Eugenio La Rocca, Mariette de Vos Raajimakers, Arnold de Vos. Pompeji: Archäologischer Führer. Lübbe, Bergisch Gladbach 1993, 1999, ISBN 3-404-64121-3
- Liselotte Eschebach (ed.). Gebäudeverzeichnis und Stadtplan der antiken Stadt Pompeji. Böhlau, Köln-Weimar-Wien 1993 ISBN 3-412-03791-5
- Robert Étienne. Pompeji. Das Leben in einer antiken Stadt. Reclam, Stuttgart 1974, 1998 (5th ed.), ISBN 3-15-010370-3
- Heinrich Nissen. Pompeianische Studien. Leipzig 1877.
- Claire de Ruyt. Macellum. Marché alimentaire des Romains. Louvain-La-Neuve 1983.
- Kurt Wallat. Die Ostseite des Forums von Pompeji. Lang, Frankfurt am Main 1997 ISBN 3-631-31190-7
- Paul Zanker. Pompeji. von Zabern, Mainz 1988 ISBN 3-8053-1685-2
