= Chiomara =

2nd-century BCE Galatian noble

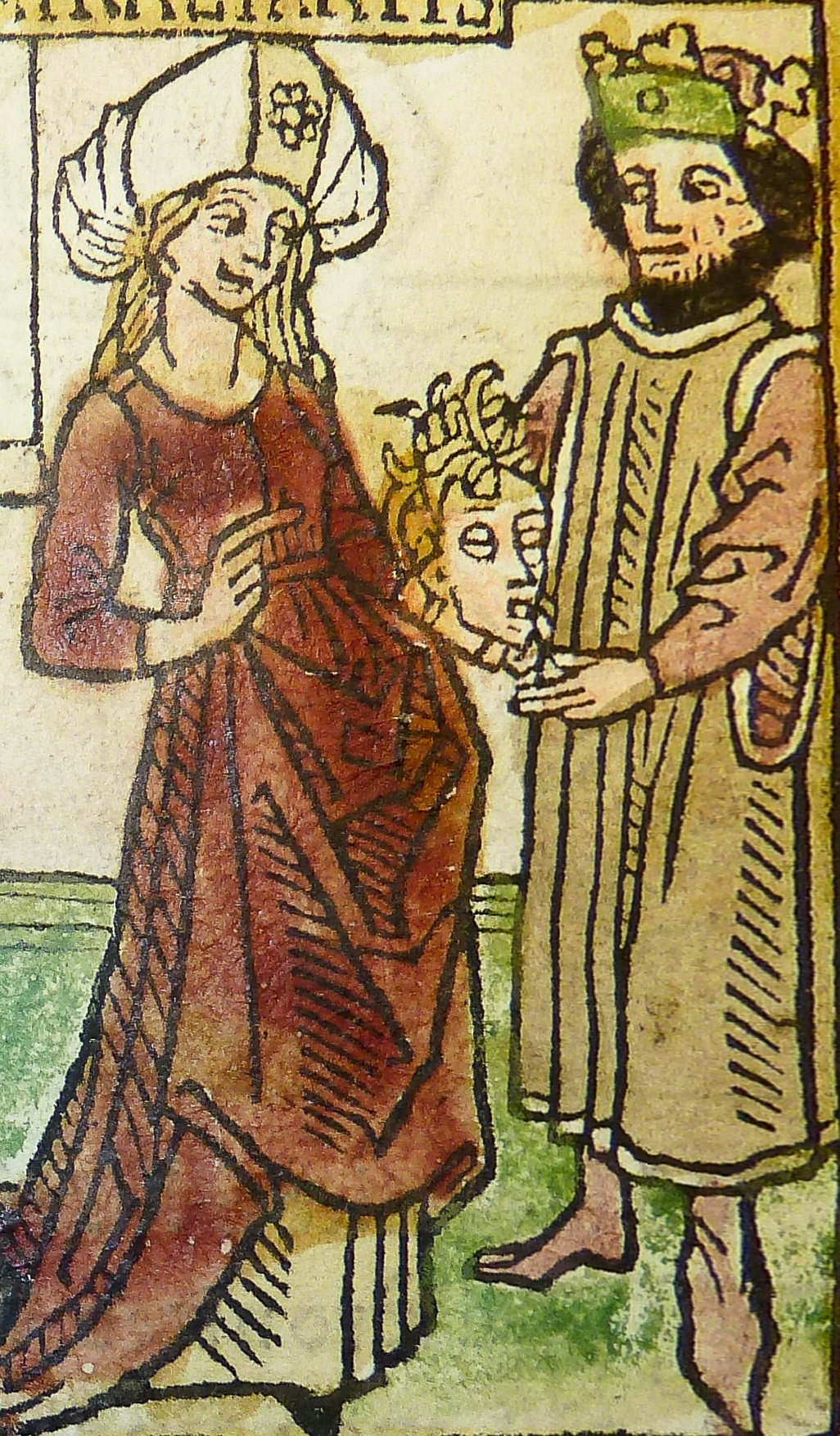
Woodcut illustration of Chiomara, printed by Johannes Zainer ca. 1474.

Chiomara (2nd-century BC) was a Galatian noblewoman and the wife of Ortiagon, chieftain of the Tectosagi, one of three Galatian tribes during the Galatian War with Rome, of 189 BC.

During this war Gnaeus Manlius Vulso was victorious in a campaign against the Galatian Gauls. One of his centurions was put in charge of a group of captives, including Chiomara, described as "a woman of exceptional beauty". He made sexual advances towards her, and when these were rejected, raped her. He then offered, to assuage his shame, to ransom her back to her people, sending one of her slaves, also a captive, with the message.

Her countrymen came to the appointed place with the ransom, but while the centurion was counting the gold, Chiomara indicated to them - with a nod, according to Plutarch, or by speaking to them in their own language, according to Livy and Valerius Maximus - that they were to cut off his head. She then carried the head home wrapped in the folds of her dress, and threw it at the feet of her husband, telling him that only one man who has been intimate with her shall remain alive.

The Greek historian Polybius is said to have met her at Sardis, and been impressed with her "good sense and intelligence". She is remembered in De Mulieribus Claris, a collection of biographies of historical and mythological women by the Florentine author Giovanni Boccaccio, composed in Latin prose in 1361–62. It is notable as the first collection devoted exclusively to biographies of women in Western literature.
