= Abbassus =

Ancient town of Phrygia

Abbassus or Ambasum (Latin: Abbassus; Ἄμβασον), was an ancient town of Phrygia, on the frontiers of the Tolistoboii, in Galatia. It is, perhaps, the same as the Alamassus reported by of Hierocles, and the Amadasse whose bishops attended early church councils. The editors of the Barrington Atlas of the Greek and Roman World note that its probable location is near Synnada, however its precise location is not known.
