= Andeda =

Town of ancient Pisidia

Coordinates: 37°16′19″N 30°15′36″E

Andeda was a town of ancient Pisidia and later of Pamphylia inhabited during Hellenistic, Roman, and Byzantine times. It was a bishopric; no longer the seat of a residential bishop, it remains a titular see of the Roman Catholic Church. It also minted coins in antiquity.

Its site is located at Yavuz, in Korkuteli, Antalya Province, Turkey.
