= Lagbe =

Ancient town of Pisidia

Coordinates: 37°08′35″N 29°55′30″E

Lagbe was a town of ancient Phrygia, now an archaeological site. It was situated northeast of the Lacus Karalitis. It was the seat of a bishop in the third century.

Its site is located near the modern village of Alifahrettin Yaylası in Isparta Province, Turkey.
