= Macellum =

Indoor market building in Ancient Rome

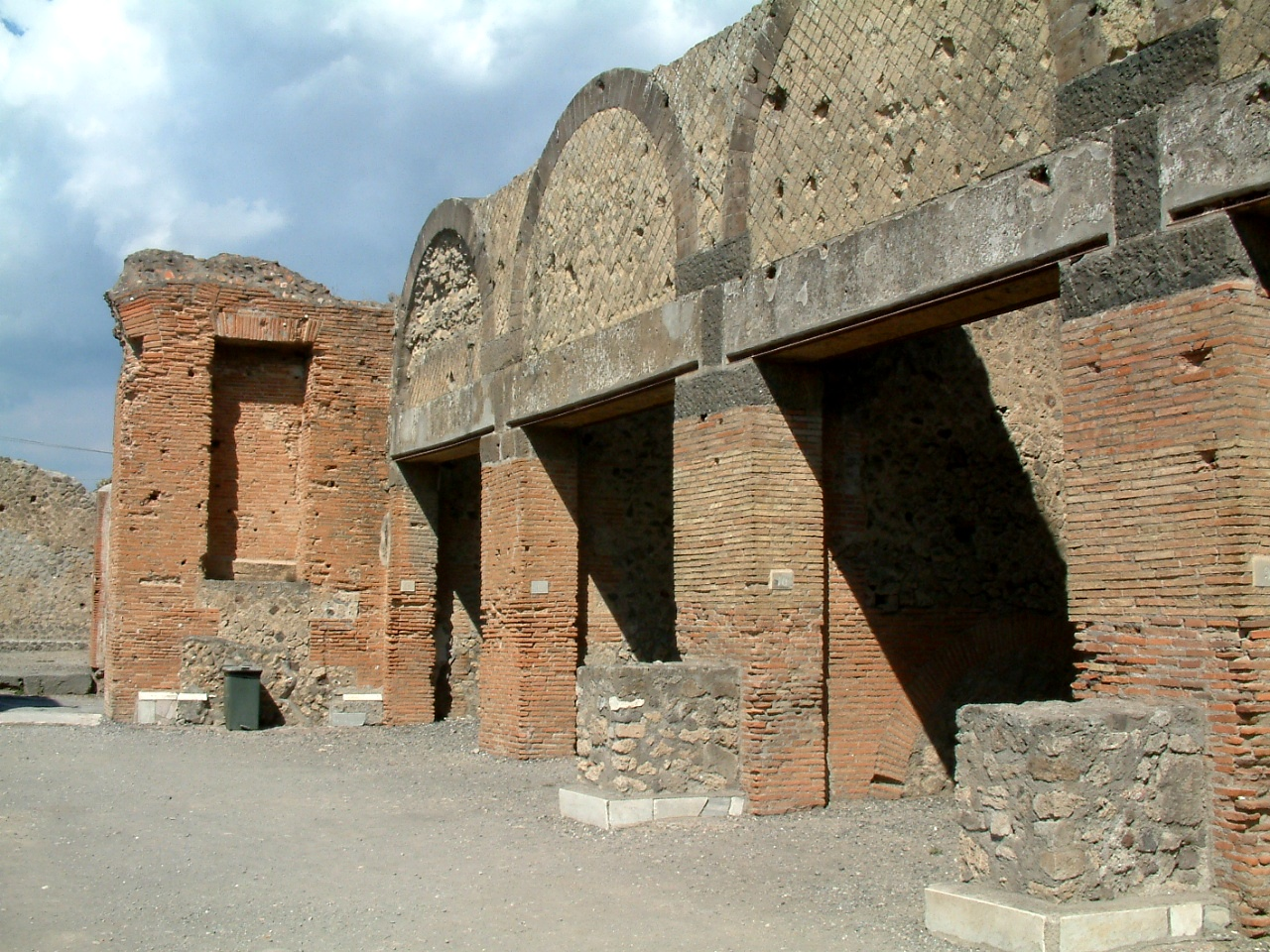
The Macellum of Pompeii

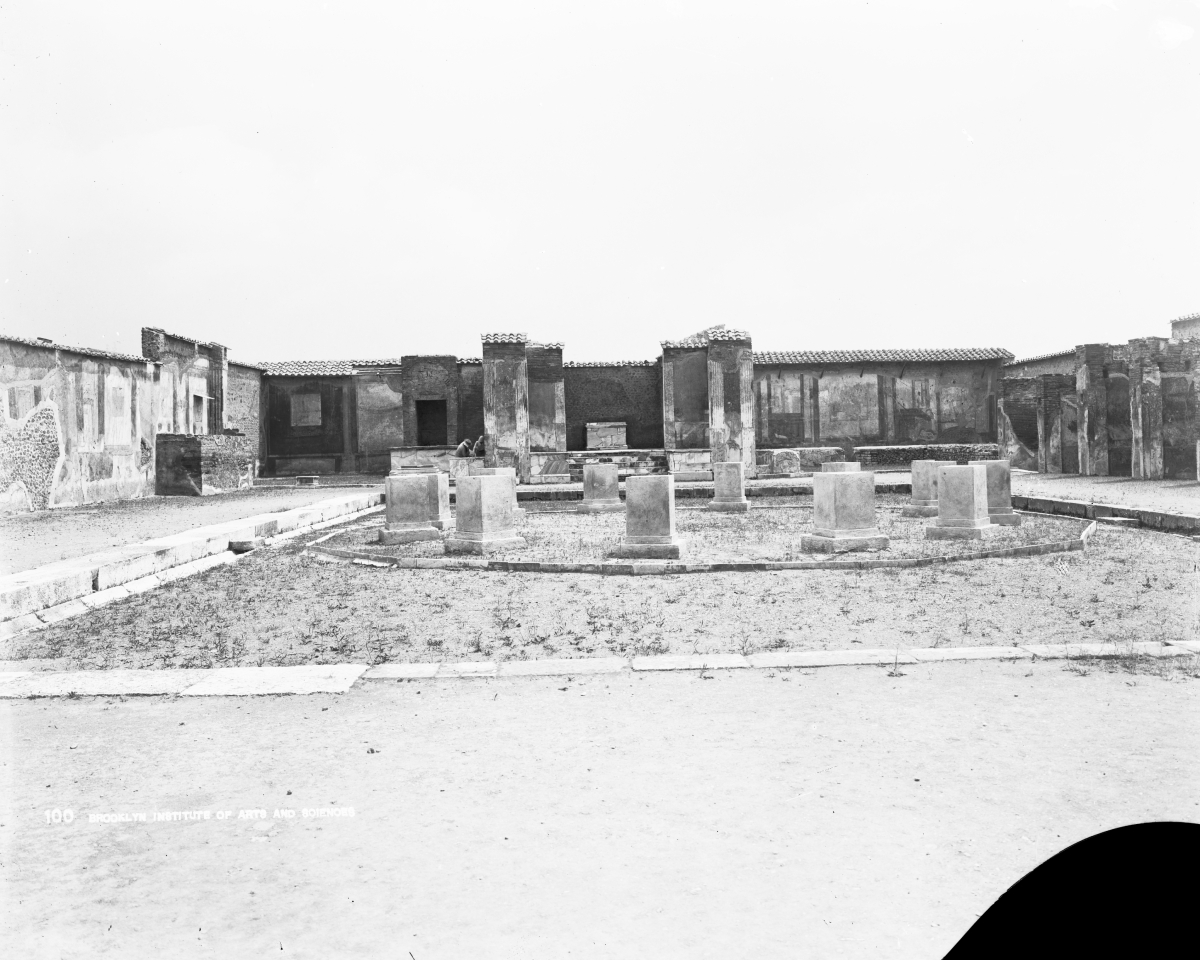
Pompeii, Italy, 1895. The Macellum. (Forum). Brooklyn Museum Archives, Goodyear Archival Collection.

A macellum (pl.: macella; Greek: μάκελλον, makellon) is an ancient Roman indoor market building that sold mostly provisions (especially meat and fish). The building normally sat alongside the forum and basilica, providing a place in which a market could be held. Each macellum sold different kinds of produce, depending on local availability, but it was not uncommon to import these comestibles, especially at ports like Pompeii.

== History ==
The macellum was a food market, particularly for meat, fish and delicatessen. Plautus mentioned such a macellum in the second half of the 3rd century BC. The macellum was modeled after the agora of Greek and Hellenistic cities, except that there was no wholesale trade. The last macella were still in operation in Constantinople in the sixth century AD.

== Physical features ==
A macellum is a fairly easy building to identify from its design. A macellum provides shops arranged around a courtyard which contains a central tholos. The tholos is a round structure, usually built upon a couple of steps (a podium), with a ring of columns supporting a domed roof. A macellum is usually square in shape. The central courtyard of the macellum is surrounded by tabernae, shops, all of the same size. It was also possible to extend the macellum upwards to include upper stories. Entrance to the macellum was either through central gates on each of the four sides or through some of the tabernae themselves. It appears that the tabernae set aside for butchers (carnificēs) were together in one area of the macellum where they were provided with marble counters, presumably to keep the meat cooler, and drains for the removal of water and fluid waste.

It has been suggested that the central tholos, also well provided with water and drains, was where fish was sold (due to excavated fish skeletons), although other uses for the central tholos have been suggested, such as the place where official weights and measures were held for reference or as shrines to the gods of the market place (due to excavated coins). Some macella had a water fountain or water feature in the centre of their courtyard instead of a tholos structure. It is the presence of this central water feature which seems to denote a building a macellum.

== List of ancient Macellums ==
=== Macellum Liviae ===
Macellum Liviae ("market of Livia") was a shopping complex built by Augustus in the name of his wife Livia, built on the Esquiline Hill in Rome.

=== Macellum Magnum ===
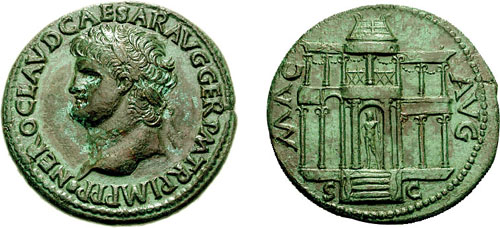
Rome's Macellum Magnum on a coin of Nero

The Macellum Magnum was a market building located on the Caelian Hill in Rome. The complex was built and dedicated by the emperor Nero in AD 59 and the location of the ancient structure likely corresponded to the current location of the church of S. Stefano Rotondo.

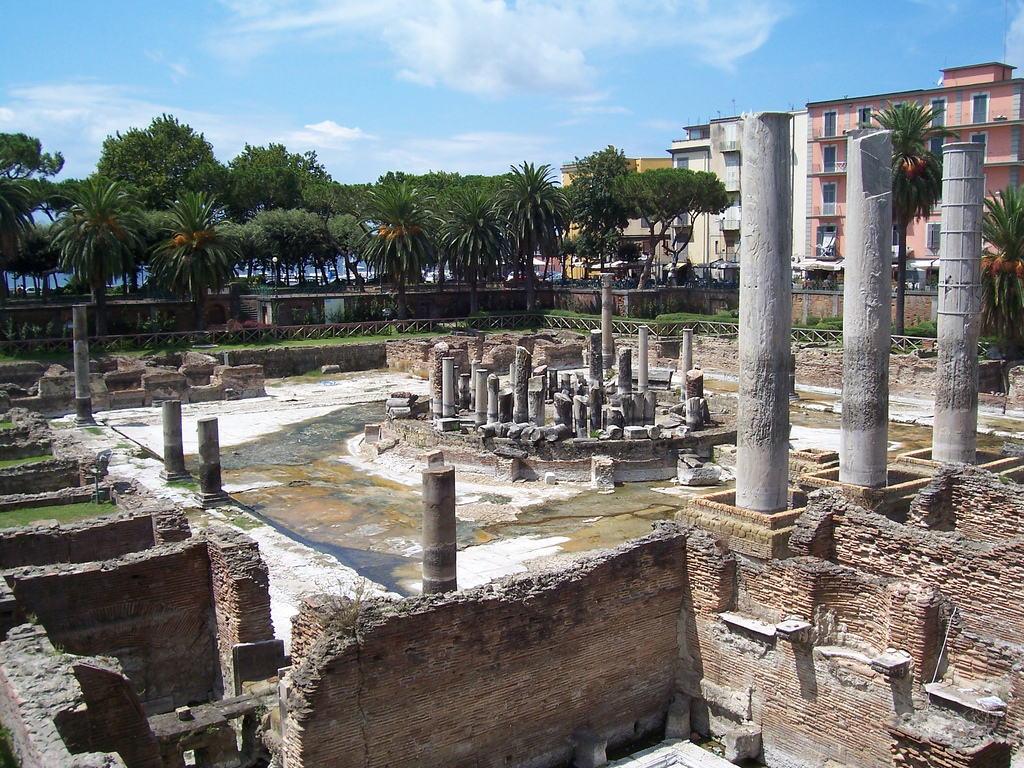
The Macellum of Pozzuoli

=== Macellum of Pozzuoli ===
The Macellum of Pozzuoli was first excavated in the 1750s, when the discovery of a statue of Serapis led to the building being misidentified as the city's Serapeum or Temple of Serapis. Standing columns with bands of boreholes left by marine mollusks showed that the height of the buildings had varied in relation to sea level, and made it the subject of debate in early geology. Subsequent excavations exposed the characteristic plan of a macellum.

=== Macellum of Pompeii ===
The Macellum of Pompeii was a provisional market located in the Forum of Pompeii. Some of the buildings have been dated to 130–120 BC. A section of the East side of the macellum is thought to be dedicated to the imperial cult. If true, this would show the important role that the emperors played in the lives of the Romans in the early 1st century. Parts of the macellum were damaged in the earthquake of 62 CE, and these damages were not repaired before the eruption of Mount Vesuvius that destroyed Pompeii in the year 79 AD.
