= Anabura (Phrygia) =

Ancient city of Phrygia

Anabura or Anaboura (Ancient Greek: Ἀνάβουρα) was a town of ancient Phrygia, inhabited during Byzantine times. Livy reports that it lay on the route of the consul Gnaeus Manlius Vulso from Synnada to the sources of the Alander. The 1911 Encyclopædia Britannica said that the town was renamed to Augustopolis (presumably in honour of the Emperor Augustus), which became the seat of the later bishopric of Augustopolis in Phrygia.

Its site is unlocated but northwest of Philomelion in Asiatic Turkey.
