= Anabura (Pisidia) =

Ancient town in Asia Monir

Coordinates: 37°59′27″N 31°17′06″E

Anabura or Anaboura (Ancient Greek: Ἀνάβουρα) was a town of ancient Pisidia, inhabited during Hellenistic, Roman, and Byzantine times.

Its site is located near Enevre in Şarkikaraağaç, Isparta Province, Turkey.
