= Sinda (Pisidia) =

Ancient town of Anatolia

Coordinates: 37°07′14″N 29°36′16″E

Sinda (Ancient Greek: Σίνδα) was an ancient town mentioned to have been situated on the western frontier of ancient Pisidia, in the neighbourhood of Cibyra and the river Caularis. Stephanus of Byzantium, who spoke of a Sindia as a town of Lycia, was thought to have alluded to the same place. Some writers have confounded Sinda with Isionda, which is the more surprising, as Livy mentions the two as different towns in the same chapter; modern scholars treat them as separate places.

Its site is located near Gölhisar in Asiatic Turkey.
