= Augustopolis in Phrygia =

City in the Roman province of Phrygia

Coordinates: 38°43′10″N 30°43′42″E

Augustopolis in Phrygia (Greek: Αύγουστούπολις) was a city and bishopric in the Roman province of Phrygia, which remains a Latin Catholic and an Orthodox titular see.

== Location and names ==
It was situated in the plain of Akar Çay (Kaystros). It was located in the middle part of the plain, but its exact location is not known. The Annuario Pontificio associates it with a modern Surmene, not the Sürmene on a part of the Black Sea coast, which belonged to the late Roman province of Pontus.

The 1911 Encyclopædia Britannica said that this Augustopolis (which presumably had its name changed in honour of the Emperor Augustus) was "formerly Anabura (Surmeneh)". The Phrygian town of Anabura is mentioned by Livy as lying on the route of the consul Gnaeus Manlius Vulso from Synnada to the sources of the Alander.

== History ==
Augustopolis was the hometown of the grammarian Eugenios, who worked under the emperor Anastasios I around the year 500. The 6th-century patriarch Eutychius of Constantinople was born at the nearby village of Theiou kome and received his education at Augustopolis. The 10th-century Arabic writer al-Mas'udi mentioned Augustopolis, as Ghuṣṭūbulī, as a place in the theme of Anatolikon where an annual perfume market took place. Later, Anna Komnene names Augustopolis (as "Agrustopolis") as the site of a battle in 1097, during the First Crusade. She wrote that the crusader army defeated Turkish forces under Danishmend, Qilij Arslan I, and Hasan of Cappadocia here and at Hebraike. Then in 1116, the Anatolian Seljuk sultan Malik Shah led an unsuccessful attack on a Byzantine army under Alexios I Komnenos before ultimately negotiating peace on the plain between Augustopolis and Akroinos. This last episode is the most important piece of evidence for locating where Augustopolis was. Augustopolis remained in diocese lists until the 12th century.

== Ecclesiastical history ==
Augustopolis in Phrygia became a Christian bishopric. In the Late Roman province of Phrygia Salutaris Prima, it was a suffragan of the capital Synnada in Phrygia's Metropolitan Archbishopric.

The names of four of its residential bishops are known because of being mentioned in extant documents.

- Philicadus was a member of the Arian faction that signed the profession of faith of Acacius of Caesarea at a synod held in Seleucia in 359.
- Diogenes is mentioned in the acts of the Second Council of Constantinople in 553.
- Nicetas was at the Second Council of Nicaea in 787
- Constantinus was at the Council of Constantinople (869).

=== Titular Sees ===
Augustopolis in Phrygia is today included in the Catholic Church's list of titular sees since the diocese's nominal restoration in the 15th century as a titular bishopric, under the name Augustopolis, until its renaming in 1933, avoiding confusion with Augustopolis in Palestina.

It is vacant since decades, having had the following incumbents, of the lowest (episcopal) rank with an archiepiscopal (intermediary rank) exception:

- Jean, Friars Minor (O.F.M.) (1446.09.02 – ?)
- Nicola de Rochis de Musciolo, Vallombrosian Benedictines (O.S.B. Vall. 1452.09.15 – ?)
- Martino (1516.09.01 – ?)
- Johann Laymann † (20 Feb 1521 Appointed – 11 June 1550)
- Eucharius Sang † (16 Feb 1598 Appointed – 11 March 1620)
- Titular Archbishop François de Harlay de Champvallon † (9 Sep 1613 Appointed – 23 Aug 1615)
- Balthazar de Budos † (3 Oct 1616 Appointed – 30 Aug 1627)
- Guy Hurault de l'Hospital † (2 April 1618 Appointed – 8 Sep 1624)
- Jodok Wagenhauer † (23 May 1622 Appointed – 19 Jan 1635)
- François Malier du Houssay † (1636 Appointed – 2 Nov 1641)
- Pierre de Bertier † (7 April 1636 Appointed – Sep 1652)
- Ferdinand de Neufville de Villeroy † (13 June 1644 Appointed – 20 Nov 1646)
- Pierre de Bedacier, Benedictines (O.S.B.) † (1 Mar 1649 Appointed – )
- Stephanus Kada † (5 Nov 1689 Appointed – )
- Maria Romedius von Sarnthein † (31 Aug 1767 Appointed – 24 March 1774)
- Alfonso Aguado y Jaraba † (9 Aug 1802 Appointed – 1815)
- Patrick Burke † (12 Jan 1819 Appointed – 8 May 1827)
- Francesco de' Marchesi Canali † (30 Sep 1834 Appointed – 8 July 1839)
- José Hilarión Etrura Cevallos, Dominican Order (O.P.) † (23 Dec 1839 Appointed – 23 June 1849)
- Atanasio Zuber, O.F.M. Cap. † (8 Mar 1854 Appointed – 14 May 1872)
- Ramón María de San José Moreno y Castañeda, Carmelite Order O. Carm. † (13 July 1883 Appointed – 26 May 1890)
- Ruggero Catizone † (11 Jul 1895 Appointed – Jan 1908)
- Joseph-Marie-Désiré Guiot, Montfort Missionaries S.M.M. † (3 April 1908 Appointed – 24 Dec 1941)
- Anton Akšamović † (28 Mar 1942 Appointed – 7 Oct 1959)
- Marius-Félix-Antoine Maziers † (17 Dec 1959 Appointed – 24 Jan 1966)
- Justin Abraham Najmy, Basilian Aleppian Order (B.A.; Antiochian Rite Eastern Catholic) † (27 Jan 1966 Appointed – 11 June 1968)

It is also an Orthodox titular metropolis in Turkey of the Ecumenical Patriarchate of Constantinople.

== See also ==
- Catholic Church in Turkey
